= Battle of White Oak Road =

Battle of the American Civil War

- Part of the American Civil War
Date	March 31, 1865
Location	Dinwiddie County, Virginia 37°8′54.4″N 77°31′10.8″W
Result	Union victory

Belligerents
United States (Union)	(Confederate States of America) Confederate States (Confederacy)

Commanders and leaders
Gouverneur K. Warren	Robert E. Lee

Units involved
V Corps	Anderson's Corps (Fourth Corps)

Strength
22,000	8,000

Casualties and losses
1,870	800

The Battle of White Oak Road, also known as The Battle of Hatcher's Run, Gravelly Run, Boydton Plank Road, White Oak Ridge was fought on March 31, 1865, during the American Civil War at the end of the Richmond-Petersburg Campaign and in the beginning stage of the Appomattox Campaign. Along with the Battle of Dinwiddie Court House which was fought simultaneously on March 31, the battle involved the last offensive action by General Robert E. Lee's Confederate Army of Northern Virginia to stop the progress of Lieutenant General Ulysses S. Grant's Union Army (Army of the Potomac, Army of the Shenandoah and Army of the James). Grant's forces were moving to cut the remaining Confederate supply lines and to force the Confederates to extend their defensive lines at Petersburg, Virginia and Richmond, Virginia to the breaking point, if not to force them into a decisive open field battle.

On March 29, 1865, the Union V Corps under Major General Gouverneur K. Warren moved to the end of the Confederates' White Oak Road Line, the far right flank of the Confederate defenses. At the conclusion of the Battle of Lewis's Farm on that day, Warren's corps took control of advance Confederate picket or outpost positions and occupied a segment of a key transportation and communication route, the Boydton Plank Road, at the junction of the Quaker Road. Warren's corps was the closest Union infantry unit to Major General Philip Sheridan's force which had moved about 4 miles (6.4 km) to Dinwiddie Court House, Virginia west of the end of the Confederate lines and just south of Five Forks, Virginia. Five Forks was an important road junction for control of the critical Confederate supply line of the South Side Railroad (sometimes shown as Southside Railroad).

Colonel Frederick Winthrop's brigade of Brigadier General Romeyn B. Ayres's division of the V Corps took a further advance position across Gravelly Run near the Confederate White Oak Road Line in torrential rain on March 30, 1865. Ayres was unaware of how close his men were settling in near the Confederate White Oak Road Line and that contrary to his observation and belief, the Confederate line extended beyond the end of his new position. This, and the separation between Ayres's corps and Sheridan's cavalry, were important factors when Ayres's troops were surprised by a Confederate attack the next day. Warren's corps, led by Brevet Major General Charles Griffin's First Division, counterattacked, pushed the Confederates back to their original lines, secured advanced positions and cut the Confederates' access to direct communication with Pickett over White Oak Road and the Boydton Plank Road. After securing his position, Warren also was able to send units to outflank and drive off Pickett's forces which were in a position to inflict a serious defeat on Sheridan's troopers whom Pickett's force had pushed back that day at Dinwiddie Court House.

The battles at White Oak Road and Dinwiddie Court House, while initially successful for the Confederates, even a tactical victory at Dinwiddie, ultimately did not advance their lines or achieve their strategic objective of weakening and driving back the Union forces or separating Sheridan's force from support. The battles and their aftermath set the stage for the Confederate defeats and the collapse of Confederate lines at the Battle of Five Forks on the following day, April 1, 1865, and the Third Battle of Petersburg (also known as the Breakthrough at Petersburg) on April 2, 1865 and ultimately led to the surrender of Lee's Army of Northern Virginia after the Battle of Appomattox Court House, Virginia on April 9, 1865.

== Background ==
=== Military situation ===
==== Siege of Petersburg ====
When two unobserved corps of the Union Army of the Potomac, which combined with the Union Army of the James outside Petersburg, failed to seize the city from a small force of Confederate defenders at the Second Battle of Petersburg, the 292-day Richmond–Petersburg Campaign (Siege of Petersburg) began. Union General-in-Chief Ulysses S. Grant had to conduct a campaign of trench warfare and attrition in which the Union forces tried to wear down the less numerous Confederate Army, destroy or cut off sources of supply and supply lines to Petersburg and Richmond and extend the defensive lines which the outnumbered and declining Confederate force had to defend to the breaking point. After the Battle of Hatcher's Run on February 5–7, 1865 extended the lines another 4 miles (6.4 km), Lee had few reserves after manning the lengthened defenses. Lee then knew that part or all of his army must leave the Richmond and Petersburg lines, obtain food and supplies at Danville, Virginia or possibly Lynchburg, Virginia and join General Joseph E. Johnston's force opposing Major General William T. Sherman's army in North Carolina. If the Confederates could quickly defeat Sherman, they might turn back to oppose Grant before he could combine his forces with Sherman's. Lee began preparations for the movement and informed Confederate President Jefferson Davis and Confederate States Secretary of War John C. Breckinridge of his conclusions and plan.

=== Battle of Fort Stedman ===
Aware that Sherman's army moving through North Carolina might combine with Grant's army at Petersburg if General Joseph E. Johnston's army could not stop Sherman, and that Lee's own declining army could not hold the Richmond and Petersburg defenses much longer, in March 1865, General Lee accepted a plan by Major General John Brown Gordon to launch an attack on Union Fort Stedman. The objective would be to break the Union lines east of Petersburg, or at least to compel the Union forces to shorten their lines by gaining ground in a substantial attack. This was supposed to permit Lee to shorten the Confederate lines and send a substantial force to help Johnston, or if necessary to give the Confederates a head start in evacuating Richmond and Petersburg and combining Lee's entire force with Johnston's dwindling army.

After Gordon's surprise attack on Fort Stedman in the pre-dawn hours of March 25, 1865 resulted in the capture of the fort, three adjacent batteries and over 500 men while killing and wounding about 500 more, the Union IX Corps under Major General John G. Parke promptly counterattacked. The IX Corps recaptured the fort and batteries, forced the Confederates to return to their lines and give up their advance picket line and inflicted about 4,000 casualties, including about 1,000 captured, which the Confederates could ill afford.

On the afternoon of March 25, at the Battle of Jones's Farm, Union forces of II Corps and VI Corps captured Confederate picket lines near Armstrong's Mill and extended the left end of the Union line about 0.25 miles (0.40 km) closer to the Confederate fortifications. This put the VI Corps which was holding this section of the line, within easy striking distance, about 0.5 miles (0.80 km), of the Confederate line. After the Confederate defeats at Fort Stedman and Jones's Farm, Lee knew that Grant would soon move against the only remaining Confederate supply lines to Petersburg, the Southside Railroad and the Boydton Plank Road and possibly cut off all routes of retreat from Richmond and Petersburg.

=== March 29 movements ===
==== Grant's orders ====
On March 24, 1865, the day before the Confederate attack on Fort Stedman, Grant already had planned an offensive for March 29, 1865. The objectives were to draw the Confederates out into a battle in which they might be defeated, or cut the remaining road and railroad supply and communication routes between areas of the Confederacy still under Confederate control and Petersburg and Richmond if the Confederates held their lines. The Battle of Fort Stedman had no effect on Grant's plans. The Union Army lost no ground due to the attack and their casualties were a small percentage of their force.

Grant ordered Major General Edward Ord's to move part of the Army of the James from the lines near Richmond to fill in the line to be vacated by the II Corps under Major General Andrew A. Humphreys at the southwest end of the Petersburg line before the II Corps moved to the west. Ord moved two divisions of Major General John Gibbon's XXIV Corps under Brigadier Generals Charles Devens and William Birney and one division of XXV Corps under Brigadier General John W. Turner to the south side of the Appomattox River. This freed two corps of Major General George Meade's Army of the Potomac for offensive action against Lee's flank and railroad supply lines: Major General Humphrey's II Corps and the V Corps under the command of Major General Gouverneur K. Warren. Grant ordered these forces, along with Major General Philip Sheridan's cavalry, still designated the Army of the Shenandoah, consisting of the First Division of Brigadier General Thomas Devin and the Third Division of Brigadier General and Brevet Major General George Armstrong Custer but both under the overall command of Brigadier General and Brevet Major General Wesley Merritt as an unofficial corps commander and the Second Division of Major General George Crook detached from the Army of the Potomac for this mission, to move west. The objectives were to bring on an open field battle to defeat the Confederates in combat or to cut the Southside Railroad and the Boydton Plank Road, which connected with the previously severed Weldon Railroad to Petersburg, and the Richmond and Danville Railroad to Richmond, and to stretch Lee's line to the breaking point.

==== Lee's orders ====
Lee, who was already concerned about the ability of his weakening army to maintain the defense of Petersburg and Richmond, realized that the defeat at Fort Stedman would encourage Grant to make a move like the one he was planning. Lee already had prepared to send some reinforcements to the western end of his line, and a mobile force beyond the end of the line to protect the junction at Five Forks, on the morning of March 29 when the Union infantry under Warren and Humphreys and the cavalry under Sheridan began their southwestward movements. Later that day Confederate forces under Major General Bushrod Johnson engaged Brevet Major General Charles Griffin's First Division of the V Corps at the Battle of Lewis's Farm.

==== Union infantry movement ====
Before dawn on March 29, Warren's V Corps moved west of the Union and Confederate lines while Sheridan's cavalry took a longer, more southerly route toward Dinwiddie Court House and Humphrey's II Corps filled in the gap between the existing end of the Union line and the new position of Warren's corps. Warren's corps led by the First Brigade of Griffin's First Division under the command of Brigadier General Joshua Chamberlain proceeded up the Quaker Road toward its intersection with the Boydton Plank Road and the Confederates' nearby White Oak Road Line.

=== Battle of Lewis's Farm ===
Along Quaker Road, across Rowanty Creek at the Lewis Farm, Chamberlain's men encountered brigades of Confederate Brigadier Generals Henry A. Wise, William Henry Wallace and Young Marshall Moody which had been sent by corps commander Lieutenant General Richard H. Anderson and his division commander Major General Bushrod Johnson to turn back the Union advance. A back-and-forth battle ensued during which Chamberlain was wounded and almost captured. Chamberlain's brigade, reinforced by a four-gun artillery battery and regiments from the brigades of Colonel and Brevet Brigadier General Edgar M. Gregory and Colonel and Brevet Brigadier General Alfred L. Pearson, who was later awarded the Medal of Honor, drove the Confederates back to their White Oak Road Line. Casualties for both sides were nearly even at 381 for the Union and 371 for the Confederates.

After the battle, Griffin's division moved up to occupy the junction of the Quaker Road and Boydton Plank Road near the end of the Confederate White Oak Road Line. Late in the afternoon of March 29, 1865, Sheridan's cavalry occupied Dinwiddie Court House on the Boydton Plank Road without opposition. The Union forces had cut the Boydton Plank Road in two places and were close to the Confederate line and in a strong position to move a large force against both the Confederate right flank and the crucial road junction at Five Forks in Dinwiddie County to which Lee was just sending defenders. The Union forces were also nearly in position to attack the two remaining Confederate railroad connections with Petersburg and Richmond, if they could take Five Forks.

Encouraged by the Confederate failure to press their attack at Lewis's Farm and their withdrawal to their White Oak Road Line, Grant decided to expand Sheridan's mission to a major offensive rather than just a possible battle or a railroad raid and forced extension of the Confederate line.

=== Movements and actions after Lewis's Farm ===
==== Confederate movements ====
Following the Battle of Lewis's Farm, in the heavy rain on the night of March 29, Lee sent Brigadier General Samuel McGowan's brigade to bolster Anderson's defense of the end of the line. Brigadier General William MacRae's brigade also was moved to the west of Burgess Mill. Major General Cadmus M. Wilcox's three other brigades had to spread out to cover the vacated defenses. McGowan and MacRae did not have enough men to enable Johnson to extend his line to Five Forks.

On March 30, a day of steady torrential rain, the Union forces consolidated their positions while Lee completed his orders for Major General George Pickett together with cavalry help from Major General Fitzhugh Lee to form a mobile task force to move 4 miles (6.4 km) from the end of the Confederate line near Hatcher's Run to Five Forks. With the gap between the end of the Confederate White Oak Road Line southwest of Petersburg and Pickett's force at Five Forks in mind, on March 30, Lee made additional deployments to strengthen his right flank. Lee would have moved men from Lieutenant General James Longstreet's force north of the James River but largely due to demonstrations and deceptions by the remaining divisions of Major General Godfrey Weitzel's XXV Corps, Longstreet thought that he still confronted Ord's entire Army of the James almost three days after Ord had gone with two divisions of the XXIV Corps, a division of the XXV Corps and Mackenzie's cavalry to the Union lines south of Petersburg.

Lee moved Brigadier General Alfred M. Scales's brigade, temporarily commanded by Colonel Joseph H. Hyman, from Major General Cadmus M. Wilcox's division's left to trenches near the junction of the White Oak Road and the Boydton Plank Road. Another of Wilcox's brigades, that of Brigadier General Young Marshall Moody under the temporary command of Colonel Martin L. Stansel, was moved to the rifle pits south of Burgess Mill. MacRae's brigade moved to the southwest side of Hatcher's Run, having already just moved to Burgess Mill. Brigadier General Eppa Hunton's brigade of Pickett's division joined Anderson and Bushrod Johnson along the White Oak Road Line near the junction with the Claiborne Road. Major General Bryan Grimes's division reinforced Brigadier General Edward L. Thomas's brigade which had to fill in part of the line formerly occupied by Scales's brigade.

Confederate First Corps Commander, Lieutenant General A. P. Hill, returned to duty from sick leave on March 31.

==== Union actions ====
The incessant rain severely hampered operations and the Union army's mobile force's ability to keep supplies moving to their new positions. A large number of Warren's V Corps soldiers had to help the teamsters move wagons and horses through the mud and even to corduroy roads. Gravelly Run was swollen to three times its usual size and bridges and pontoons on Hatcher's Run were swept away.

Skirmishers from the V Corps kept the Confederates mostly in their White Oak Road Line between the Boydton Plank Road and Claiborne Road on March 30. Despite incomplete information and somewhat vague and conflicting orders from Meade and Grant, on Grant's order, Warren pushed the Union V Corps forward to strengthen his hold on a part of the Boydton Plank Road. The V Corps entrenched a line to cover that road from its intersection with Dabney Mill Road south to Gravelly Run. In the afternoon, Warren saw Griffin's men take over Confederate outposts but he also saw that any attempted movement further up the Boydton Plank Road was covered by Confederate artillery and fortifications.

Meanwhile, Humphrey's II Corps closed the gap between the V Corps and the XXIV Corps. The XXIV Corps captured a large part of the Confederate picket line in their front. Humphrey's corps also moved as close to the Confederate line as possible without starting a general engagement and entrenched at the forward positions. Union casualties for the March 30 actions at the White Oak Road Line were 1 killed, 7 wounded and 15 missing; the number of Confederate casualties is unknown.

During the night of March 30, Grant advised Meade not to have the VI Corps and IX Corps make a general attack along the line on March 31 as earlier planned, but to stand ready to take advantage of any sign that the Confederates had weakened their line. Grant also noted that he wanted to shift forces to the west so that Warren would have his whole force available to reinforce Ayres.

==== Ayres's division's advance ====
Brigadier General Romeyn B. Ayres's division of the V Corps also made a reconnaissance toward White Oak Road a short distance west of Claiborne Road. The lead brigade under Colonel Frederick Winthrop crossed a swollen branch of Gravelly Run which was to feature in the following day's battle. Two other brigades did not cross Gravelly Run but began to entrench. Winthrop's men saw the movement west of Pickett's brigades and captured a Confederate officer who provided information about the movement of Pickett's force that was sent to Meade. In his advanced position opposite forested terrain, Ayres saw only empty space to the northeast and failed to see heavy fortifications near the intersection of White Oak Road and Claiborne Road which angled sharply back to Hatcher's Run directly to his north. As dark approached, Ayres had a number of outposts prepared to cover his position, which turned out to be about 0.75 miles (1.21 km) beyond the point where the Confederate line veered sharply back to the north. Ayres ordered the two brigades which had not crossed Gravelly Run to come across and join Winthrop's men at the S. Dabney house at dawn.

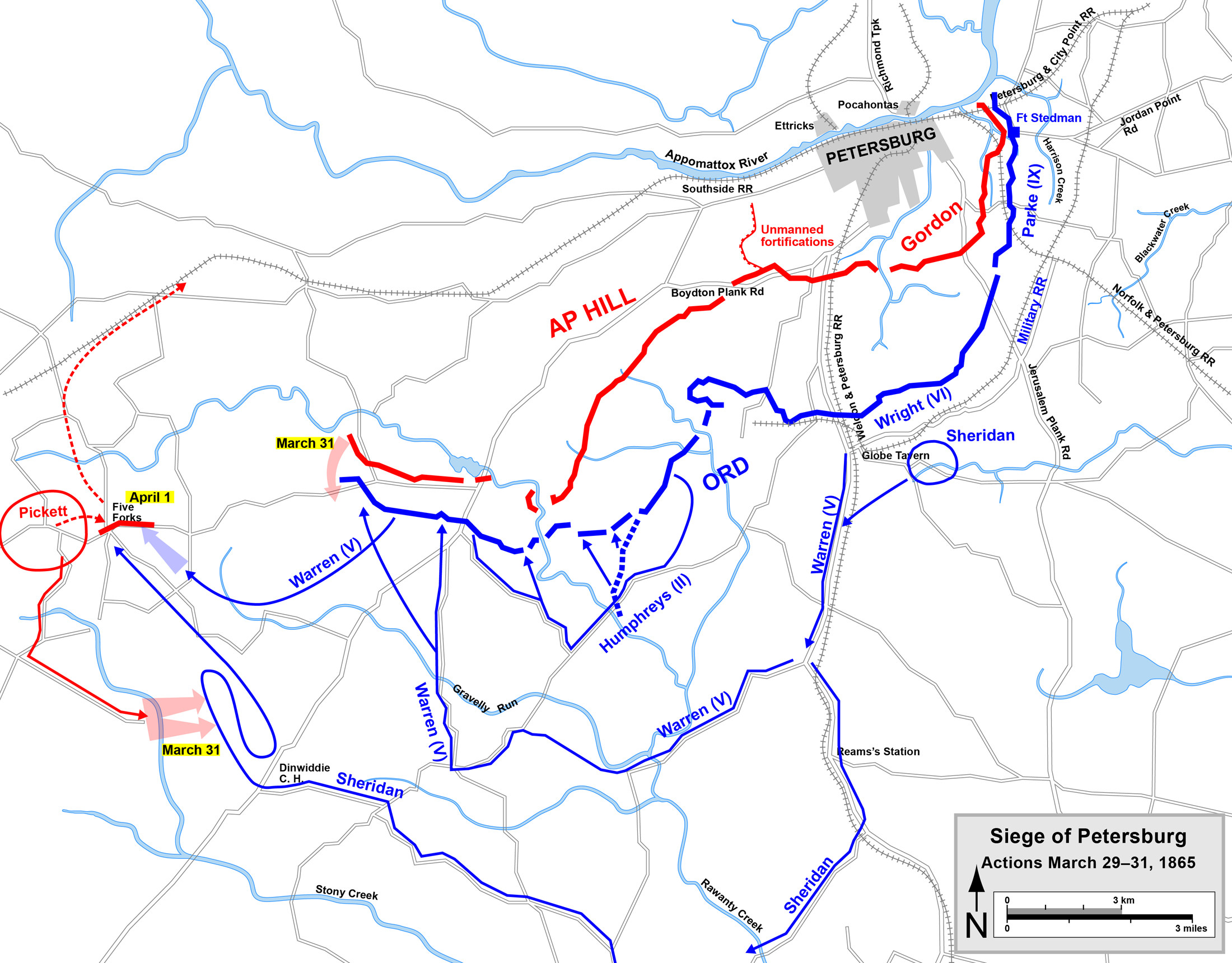
Actions at Petersburg before and during the Battle of Five Forks

== Battle ==
=== Lee orders an attack ===
On the morning of March 31, General Lee inspected his White Oak Road Line and learned that the Union left flank held by Ayres's division was "in the air" and that there was a wide gap between the Union infantry and Sheridan's nearest cavalry units near Dinwiddie Court House. He ordered Brigadier Generals McGowan and Hunton to bring their brigades to the far right of Anderson's position which would bring Bushrod Johnson's division back to its strength before the transfer of Ransom's and Wallace's brigades to Pickett. Lee ordered Johnson to attack the exposed Union line. Along with McGowan's and Hunton's brigades, Johnson had his own brigades under the command of Brigadier General Henry A. Wise and Colonel Martin L. Stansel in lieu of Brigadier General Young Marshall Moody who was ill. The four Confederate brigades from three divisions, which were in turn from three different corps, worked well together in the actions on March 31.

=== Johnson's attack ===
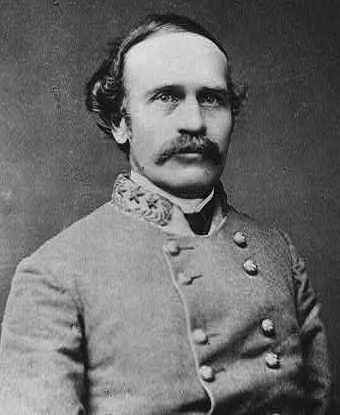
Major General Bushrod Johnson

Before Johnson's brigades could start their attack on the advance Union position, at Ayres's request, Warren moved a brigade from Brigadier General and Brevet Major General Samuel W. Crawford's division toward White Oak Road in order to secure Ayres's position and to disperse the Confederate pickets. At 8:15 a.m., Warren advised Ayres that Sheridan had implied in correspondence to him that Merritt's force had been dislodged from White Oak Road and that Ayres should be looking for an attack from the west or the north. Due to the condition of the roads and Gravelly Run, Crawford's men did not get into formation until 10:00 a.m.

Meanwhile, having seen the movement of Ayres's and Crawford's brigades toward the Confederate line, Johnson allowed Hunton's and Stansel's brigades to advance to meet the Union formations even though McGowan's brigade on the far right was not ready. The Confederates were able to approach the Union force while screened by woods north of White Oak Road. As Ayres's division, led by Winthrop's brigade, advanced across a field toward White Oak Road with the intention of seizing advanced Confederate rifle pits, the Confederates began to fire from the woods, out of sight of the Union force.

Wise's brigade moved out of the works but did not join the fight because they were apparently waiting for orders. General Lee finally ordered Wise to take up a position on Hunton's left as regiments from one of Crawford's other two brigades put up stiff resistance to the advancing Confederates. As the fight developed, Wise's brigade did not engage the V Corps.

Even before they received Johnson's order, all three of the Confederate brigades, including McGowan's, attacked both Ayres's division and all of Crawford's division which quickly joined the fight to support Ayres's units and their own advanced brigade. The Confederates defeated and drove off all of the brigades of these two divisions, in turn.

Although outnumbered and occasionally checked by the stand of some Union brigades, the three Confederate brigades in action first drove the four Union brigades, three from Ayres's division and one from Crawford's, back across Gravelly Run. Then Stansel's brigade drove back Union Brigadier General Henry Baxter's brigade and a reformed part of Colonel James Gwyn's brigade still forward of Gravelly Run. The forward Union regiments of Baxter's brigade fell back to find the remainder of the brigade had retreated. In an effort to rally Crawford's division, since it was too late to stop Ayres's division's retreat, Warren himself also came forward, grabbed a regimental flag and tried unsuccessfully to rally the retreating Union men. Warren's heroic effort was to no avail and he retreated across the creek, stopped the panic and had the scattered regiments reform behind Griffin's division. The last organized resistance across Gravelly Run was Colonel John A. Kellogg's brigade of Crawford's division which was driven back after a fighting retreat. Four Confederate brigades, only three of which saw any real action against V Corps divisions, had thrown back two Union divisions of over 5,000 men.

Griffin's division and the V Corps artillery under Colonel and Brevet Brigadier General Charles S. Wainwright, which had to carry their four guns forward through the mud, finally stopped the Confederate advance short of crossing Gravelly Run. The Confederates fell back about 400 yards from the run when they met the fire from Griffin and Wainwright, although historian Ed Bearss states that the Confederates only meant to make a forced reconnaissance at the run, not to cross it.

=== Humphrey's actions ===
Humphrey had relieved Griffin's division in the rifle pits early in the morning. Although it took Griffin some time to move to concentrate with Warren's other divisions, they arrived in time to stabilize the situation after Ayres's and Crawford's divisions had been driven back.

Warren sent word to Humphrey's for help when he learned of the situation of Ayres's and Crawford's divisions in retreat. At about 12:30 p.m., Humphreys sent two of Brigadier General Nelson Miles's brigades forward and they initially surprised and, after the first brigade suffered a repulse, drove back Wise's brigade on the left of the Confederate line after a sharp fight. They took about 100 prisoners from Wise's brigade.

Hunton's brigade had shifted to the left to help Wise's brigade and Stansel's brigade had to shift to the right and left. Then Johnson ordered his men to hold their positions since he doubted they could cross Gravelly Run, and after examining the area, General Lee approved Johnson's decision.

Humphrey's also ordered three diversionary demonstrations along the line. Two regiments of Brigadier General (Brevet Major General) Gershom Mott's division marched against the Confederate line west of the Crow House redoubt while two other regiments from that division captured part of the Confederate picket line along the Boydton Plank Road line near Burgess Mill. Skirmishers from Brigadier General William Hays's division were able to put some guns out of action in Confederate Fort Powell at Burgess Mill which covered the junction of the White Oak Road and the Boydton Plank Road before Hays's men were thrown back by the defenders.

=== Missed Union opportunity ===
Because no reinforcements were available, Johnson pulled his tired men back to the line of fortifications south of White Oak Road that Ayres's men had set up the night before. Miles saw through his field glasses that the Confederate rifle pits west of Boydton Plank Road were unoccupied but because the 5th New Hampshire Regiment's attack was in the wrong place on the line, the Confederates were able to reoccupy the empty trenches.

=== Union counterattack ===
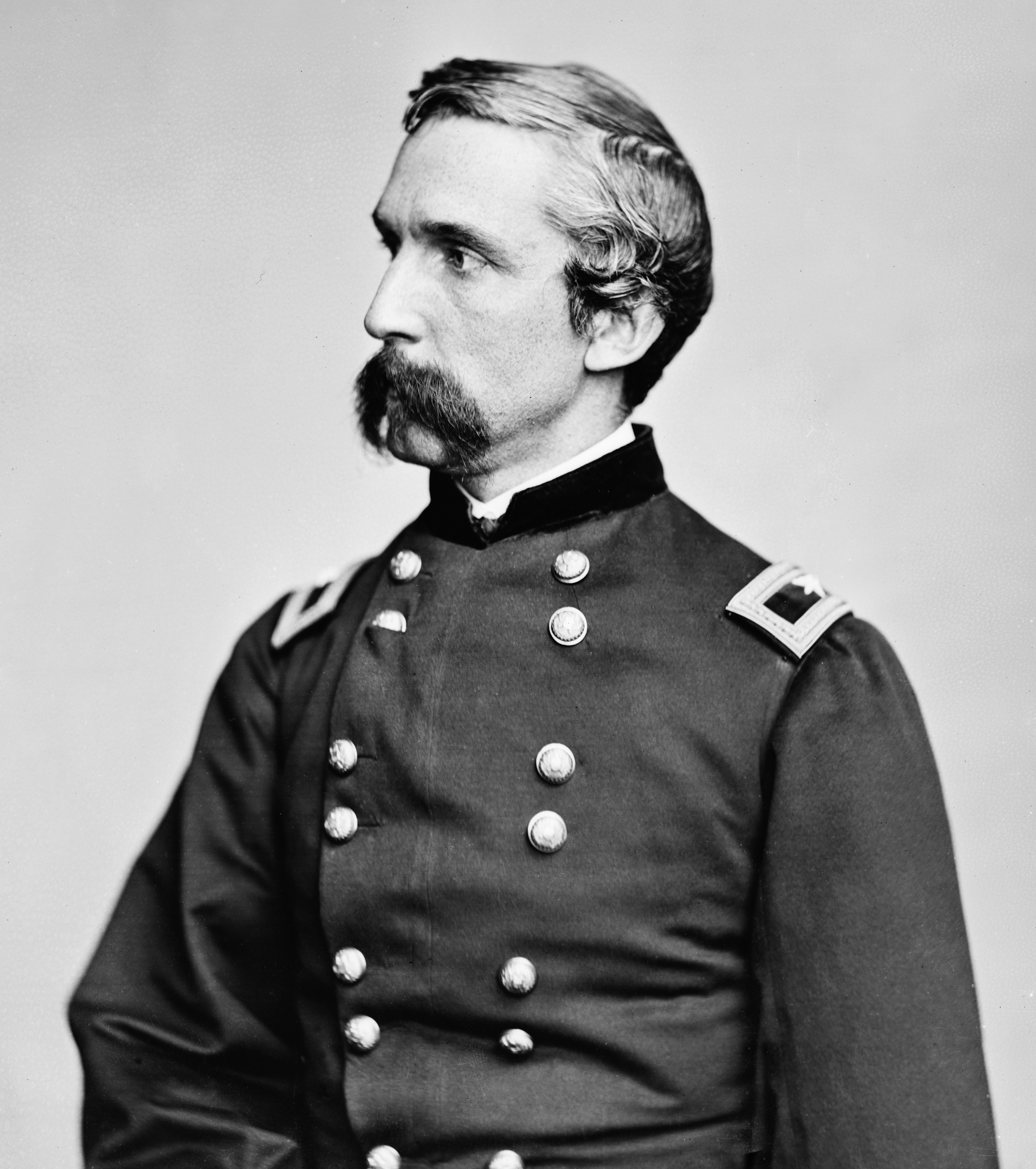
Brigadier General Joshua Chamberlain

Griffin's V Corps brigades and Wainwright's artillery stabilized the Union line by 1:00 p.m., about two and one-half hours after the battle started. Warren and Griffin then approached Brigadier General Joshua Chamberlain, wounded only two days earlier at the Battle of Lewis's Farm, with the question: "General Chamberlain, will you save the honor of the Fifth Corps?" Despite the pain from his wounds suffered at Lewis's Farm, Chamberlain agreed to the assignment. At 2:30 p.m., Chamberlain's men forded the cold, swollen Gravelly Run, followed by the rest of Griffin's division and then the rest of Warren's reorganized units.

From Johnson's new position in rifle pits south of White Oak Road, which had been constructed by Ayres's men, the Confederates hit Chamberlain's men with a heavy fire as they emerged from the nearby woods. Warren ordered Chamberlain to hold his position but Chamberlain suggested to Griffin that they would be better off attacking the Confederates than remaining under fire and being picked off. Griffin approved the proposal and Chamberlain's brigade, along with the brigade commanded by Colonel and Brevet Brigadier General Edgar M. Gregory, charged Hunton's brigade and drove them back to the White Oak Road Line. Then Chamberlain's and Gregory's men crossed White Oak Road. The remainder of the Confederate force then had to withdraw to prevent being outflanked and overwhelmed.

Warren's men pursued across White Oak Road west of Claiborne Road but after a personal reconnaissance in which Warren and a large party of scouts came under fire, Warren concluded that an immediate attack on the Confederate fortifications would gain nothing. Warren's corps ended the battle having gained possession of a part of White Oak Road to the west of the Confederate right flank, which was between the end of the Confederate line and Pickett's force at Five Forks. Ayres's division, which had not engaged in the combat as Chamberlain and Gregory pushed the Confederates back, stopped just short of White Oak Road, facing west toward Five Forks. This cut the direct communication route between Anderson's (Johnson's) and Pickett's forces and nearly completely cut communication between them.

Warren connected his forces before receiving a message from Meade's chief of staff, Brigadier General and Brevet Major General Alexander S. Webb, to do just that. Webb stated that it was believed that Sheridan was advancing but in fact they were being pushed back by Pickett's force at the Battle of Dinwiddie Court House.

=== Casualties ===
Historian Chris M. Calkins gives the Union casualties (killed, wounded, missing – presumably mostly captured) as 1,407 from the Fifth Corps and 461 from the Second Corps and Confederate casualties as about 800. The Civil War Trust online gives similar casualty figures in round numbers as 1,800 of the Union force and 800 of the Confederate force. David W. Lowe in Frances H. Kennedy, ed., The Civil War Battlefield Guide gives the casualties as Union 1,781 and Confederate as 900–1,235.

== Aftermath ==
As a result of the battle, the Confederates had lost control of the White Oak Road, were trapped in their works and had lost the direct line of communication to Pickett's force. The Confederates had taken losses they could not afford and suffered a blow to their morale.

While Warren's V Corps led by Griffin's division, with help from Miles's division of Humphrey's II Corps, turned the Battle of White Oak Road into a Union victory, Sheridan had to save his imperiled troopers who were hard pressed as the Battle of Dinwiddie Court House ended for the day. The Confederates won the day on March 31 at Dinwiddie Court House by pushing the Union cavalry into a tight position. But when Warren heard the sound of the distant battle receding toward Dinwiddie Court House, he sent Brigadier General Joseph J. Bartlett's brigade of Griffin's division to reinforce Sheridan and attack Pickett's force on its flank. Since it was dark when Bartlett's men reach Gravelly Run, they did not try to cross but engaged the Confederates on the other side with sniper fire.

About 6:00 p.m., Meade learned that Pickett in fact was pushing Sheridan back to Dinwiddie Court House. Meade ordered Warren to send a force to Sheridan down the Boydton Plank Road. Warren sent three regiments of Bartlett's brigade which had been guarding wagons to Sheridan down the Boydton Plank Road.

Pickett realized his position was untenable after he learned between 9:00 p.m. and 10:00 p.m. that Bartlett's brigade was on its way to reinforce Sheridan, exposing his force to flanking Union infantry attack. So Pickett withdrew to Five Forks later that night, ceding any advantage his attack on Sheridan might have gained. Bartlett's brigade was only the lead unit for all of Griffin's and Crawford's divisions which were put on the march later that night and would have trapped Pickett's force between them and Sheridan's troops. This would have given the Confederate force no apparent alternatives other than surrender or flight to the west. Pickett's retreat at least gave him an opportunity to defend Five Forks and the Southside Railroad.

Additional orders and messages passed among Warren, Grant, Meade and Sheridan that night although the full information was shared by none. At 8:45 p.m., Grant directed Meade to send a division from the V Corps to Sheridan's aid. Orders were changed, including whether Bartlett should be recalled to join with the rest of Griffin's division. Warren's corps was without pontoons because they had been used at Rowanty Creek and the Quaker Road crossing of Gravelly Run so that when his entire corps had to move west it was delayed by the need to bridge the Boydton Plank Road crossing of Gravelly Run, which Warren was advised was completed at 2:05 a.m. Meade did not tell Grant that the plan to move Warren's entire corps to Sheridan's aid and to cover the Boydton Plank Road line with only the II Corps was Warren's idea. When Grant notified Sheridan that the V Corps and Ranald Mackenzie's cavalry had been ordered to his support, he gratuitously and without any basis said that Warren should reach him "by 12 tonight," an impossibility under the circumstances. Ayres's division arrived at Sheridan's position at dawn. The Confederates had retreated so Ayres's men rested until 2:00 p.m.

Sheridan had received wrong information so he thought the V Corps was in the rear and almost on the flank of the Confederates and therefore he mistakenly thought V Corps could launch an early, severe attack on Pickett's force. Warren had to carefully move Griffin's and Crawford's divisions because of the possibility of attack from the Confederates as they withdrew from the White Oak Road Line and at positions near Dinwiddie where Confederates were earlier positioned and he carefully supervised this in person, putting him at the end of the column when they troops moved. At 6:00 a.m., Meade's Chief of Staff Alexander S. Webb sent an order to Warren to report to Sheridan for orders. Two divisions had done so within the hour, and before Warren had received the order, but Warren did not personally meet with Sheridan until 11:00 a.m.

When the Confederates reached Five Forks, they began to improve the trenches and fortifications, including establishing a return or refusal of the line running north of the left or eastern side of their trenches.

Warren's gains along the White Oak Road on March 31, 1865 and the movement of Warren's divisions which sent Pickett's men back to Five Forks from Dinwiddie Court House and later positioned his corps with Sheridan's force set the stage for the Confederate defeat at the Battle of Five Forks the following day and the Union breakthrough at the Third Battle of Petersburg on April 2, 1865.

== Battlefield preservation ==
As of late 2021, the American Battlefield Trust and its partners have acquired and preserved 951 acres (3.85 km^{2}) of the battlefield in more than a dozen transactions since 1989. A walking trail of two-thirds of a mile includes the remains of Confederate earthworks and two well-preserved gun emplacements as well as signs detailing the 1865 battle. It begins next to the intersection of White Oak and Clairborne Roads (Va. Routes 613 and 631).
