= 155th Pennsylvania Infantry Regiment =

Union Army infantry regiment

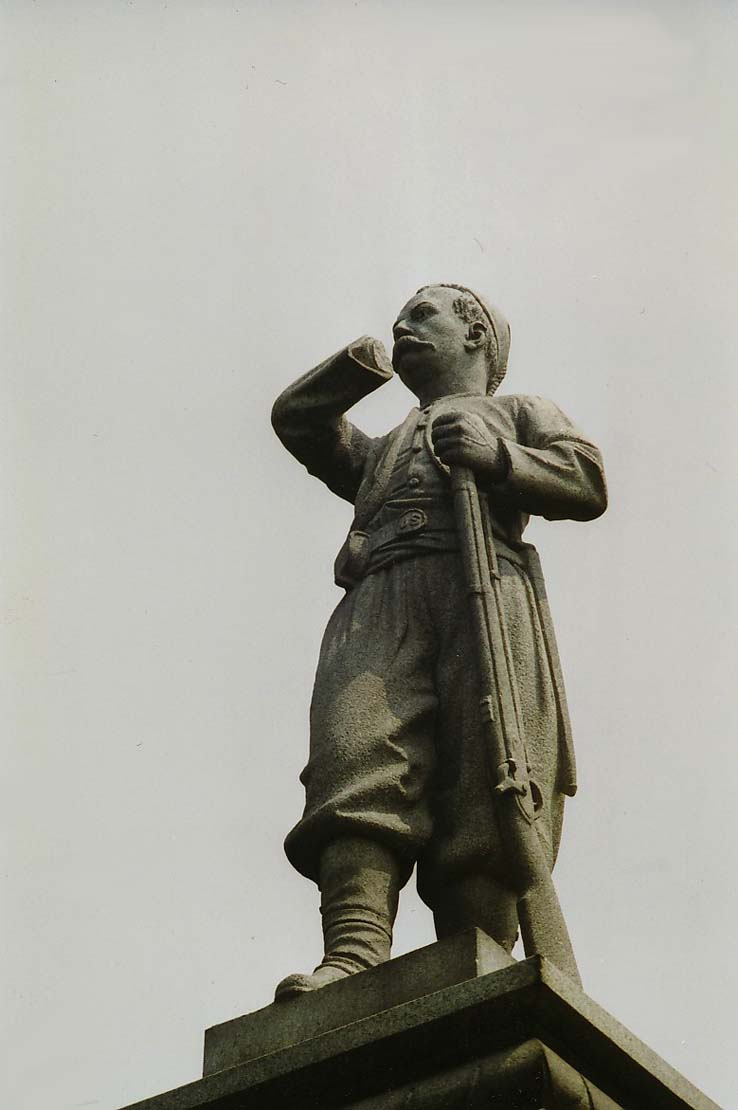
Gettysburg memorial

The 155th Pennsylvania Volunteer Infantry Regiment was a Federal infantry regiment that served in the American Civil War in the Army of the Potomac in the Eastern Theater of the conflict.

== Organization ==
Recruits from the Pittsburgh area and Allegheny County organized at Camp Copeland from September 2–19, 1862 into the 155th Regiment Pennsylvania Volunteer Infantry. Edward J. Allen served as the first colonel.

== Service ==
After initial training and drilling, the regiment moved via train to Washington, D.C. where it joined the 2nd Brigade, 3rd Division of the Union Fifth Corps. From there, it went to Sharpsburg, Maryland, after the Battle of Antietam. Their first introduction to battle came on December 13, 1862, at the Battle of Fredericksburg where the color guard suffered heavy casualties in an ill-fated assault.

During its first years, the regiment wore the regulation uniform of the Union Army, but in February 1864 they, along with the 140th New York received a uniform inspired by the French Zouave uniform. Another regiment in the brigade, the 146th New York Volunteer Infantry, had already been issued their Zouave uniform in June 1863. The 140th New York wore a predominantly dark blue Zouave uniform with red trim. The 146th New York wore a light blue uniform with red and yellow trim. The 155th Pennsylvania uniform was French blue (not dark blue) with yellow trim that featured very large yellow "tombeaux", a stylized false pocket on the front left and right breasts of the jacket. A red Zouave sash with yellow trim, a red fez with yellow trim with a dark blue tassle attached, completed the uniform. Slight variations in jacket styles can be seen in the unit's regimental history entitled "Under the Maltese Cross" published in 1910.

The regiment was part of Stephen H. Weed's V Corps brigade at the Battle of Gettysburg, where it lost six men killed and thirteen wounded.

The 155th Pennsylvania along with the 140th New York and the 146th New York became the "Zouave Brigade" in the Army of the Potomac's Fifth Corps. The brigade would later grow with the addition of the 5th New York Veteran Volunteer Infantry Regiment, however the 155th would be transferred to another brigade due to a disagreement between the regiment's colonel and the brigade commander.

Colonel and Brevet Brigadier General Alfred L. Pearson, commander of the regiment at the Battle of Lewis's Farm on March 29, 1865, was awarded the Medal of Honor on September 17, 1897, for his actions leading a counterattack which regained lost ground and repulsed the Confederates, driving them back to their original positions.

On June 2, 1865, the regiment was mustered out of service. Of the regiment's soldiers, 254 died while serving with the 155th: 142 (including five officers) as combat deaths and 112 through natural causes.

== See also ==
- List of Pennsylvania Civil War regiments
