= Battle of Lewis's Farm =

Battle of the American Civil War

Coordinates: 37°07′42″N 77°31′40″W

- Part of the American Civil War
| Date | March 29, 1865 |
| Location | Dinwiddie County, Virginia |
| Result | Union victory |

Belligerents
| United States (Union) | (Confederate States of America) Confederate States (Confederacy) |

Commanders and leaders
| Gouverneur K. Warren; Joshua Chamberlain | Bushrod Johnson |

Strength
| 17,000 | 8,000 |

Casualties and losses
| 381 (Note: Kennedy, p. 412; Salmon, p. 459; NPS Archived May 8, 2008, at the Wayback Machine cites 381 Union and 371 Confederate; Eicher, p. 806, states "370 killed and wounded in Warren's corps; at least 130 Confederates were killed and 200 captured.") | 371 |

The Battle of Lewis's Farm (also known as Quaker Road, Military Road, or Gravelly Run) was fought on March 29, 1865, in Dinwiddie County, Virginia near the end of the American Civil War. In climactic battles at the end of the Richmond–Petersburg Campaign, usually referred to as the Siege of Petersburg, (Note: The campaign was not a true siege because the Confederate Army and the cities of Petersburg and Richmond were never surrounded and actions took place at locations other than Petersburg, principally in the Richmond area. See the Siege of Petersburg article for further details.) starting with Lewis's Farm, the Union Army commanded by Lieutenant General Ulysses S. Grant dislodged the Confederate Army of Northern Virginia commanded by General Robert E. Lee from defensive lines at Petersburg, Virginia and the Confederate capital of Richmond, Virginia. Many historians and the United States National Park Service consider the Battle of Lewis's Farm to be the opening battle of the Appomattox Campaign, which resulted in the surrender of Lee's army on April 9, 1865. (Note: Bryce A. Suderow, in his introduction to Chapter 5 of Ed Bearss's 2014 edition of Volume II of The Petersburg Campaign: The Western Front Battles, September 1864–April 1865, says this battle should be considered "the first battle of what should be viewed as the Five Forks Campaign." Bearss, 2014, p. 313.)

In the early morning of March 29, 1865, two corps of the Union Army of the Potomac, the V Corps under Major General Gouverneur K. Warren and the II Corps under Major General Andrew A. Humphreys, moved to the south and west of the Union line south of Petersburg toward the end of the Confederate line. The Confederate defenses were manned by the Fourth Corps of the Army of Northern Virginia under the command of Lieutenant General Richard H. Anderson. The corps only included the division of Major General Bushrod Johnson.

Turning north and marching up the Quaker Road toward the Confederate line, Warren's lead brigade, commanded by Brigadier General Joshua Chamberlain, engaged three brigades of Johnson's division at the Lewis Farm. Reinforced by a four-gun artillery battery and later relieved by two large regiments from the brigade commanded by Colonel (Brevet Brigadier General) Edgar M. Gregory, the Union troops ultimately forced the Confederates back to their defenses and captured an important road junction. Chamberlain was wounded and narrowly escaped capture. Union Colonel (Brevet Brigadier General) Alfred L. Pearson was awarded the Medal of Honor 32 years later for his heroic actions at the battle.

Casualties were nearly even at 381 for the Union and 371 for the Confederates, but as the battle ended, Warren's corps held an important objective, a portion of the Boydton Plank Road at its junction with the Quaker Road. Within hours, Major General Philip Sheridan's cavalry corps, which was still acting apart from the Army of the Potomac as the Army of the Shenandoah, occupied Dinwiddie Court House. This action also severed the Boydton Plank Road. The Union forces were close to the Confederate line and poised to attack the Confederate flank, the important road junction of Five Forks and the two Confederate railroad lines to Petersburg and Richmond that remained open to the two cities.

On April 2–3, 1865, the Confederates evacuated Petersburg and Richmond and began to move to the west. After a number of setbacks and mostly small battles, but including a significant Confederate defeat at the Battle of Sailor's Creek on April 6, 1865, Lee surrendered his army to Grant and his pursuing Union Army on April 9, 1865, at Appomattox Court House, about 25 miles (40 km) east of Lynchburg, Virginia. By the end of June 1865, all Confederate armies had surrendered and the Confederacy's government had collapsed.

== Background ==
=== Richmond–Petersburg Campaign ===
On June 15–18, 1864, two Union Army corps, moved unobserved from the stalemated battle lines just north of Richmond across the James River to the south of Petersburg, Virginia. The Union force which joined with the Union Army of the James at Petersburg failed to seize the city from a small force of Confederate defenders at the Second Battle of Petersburg. By June 18, 1864, the Army of Northern Virginia had reinforced the defenders and the 292-day Richmond–Petersburg Campaign (Siege of Petersburg) had begun.

Grant's strategy had to become a campaign of trench warfare attrition in which the Union forces tried to wear down the Confederate Army, destroy or cut off sources of supply and supply lines to Petersburg and Richmond and to extend the lines which the outnumbered and declining Confederate force had to defend to the breaking point.

During the rest of 1864 and early 1865, Grant slowly moved his forces in the Union line south of Petersburg to the west in six more Petersburg offensives, usually with simultaneous attacks at or near the Richmond lines. The Confederates extended their lines to compensate for these moves, but they were stretched increasingly thin. With supplies and men increasingly hard for Lee to obtain or replace, he knew that his army could not defend Petersburg and Richmond from the growing Union forces indefinitely, especially with the expected arrival of Union reinforcements from recent recruits in training, Major General Philip Sheridan's cavalry divisions from the Shenandoah Valley and possibly even Major General William T. Sherman's armies already operating in North Carolina when the roads dried out after spring rains abated.

After the Battle of Hatcher's Run on February 5–7, 1865 extended the lines another 4 miles (6.4 km), Lee had few reserves after manning the new defenses. (Note: Lee had to use two of his three reserve units to hold the extended line. Bearss, Edwin C., with Bryce A. Suderow. The Petersburg Campaign. Vol. 2, The Western Front Battles, September 1864 – April 1865. El Dorado Hills, CA: Savas Beatie, 2014. ISBN 978-1-61121-104-7. p. 239.) (Note: Shelby Foote stated that the Confederate line was extended 3 miles (4.8 km) to 37 miles (60 km), "exclusive of recurrent jogs and doublings", and that his strength was reduced to 46,398 men "present for duty." Foote, 1974, p. 785.) He then knew that part or all of his army must leave the Richmond and Petersburg lines, obtain food and supplies at Danville, Virginia or possibly Lynchburg, Virginia and join General Joseph E. Johnston's force opposing Sherman's army. If the Confederates could quickly defeat Sherman, they might turn back to oppose Grant before he could combine his forces with the remainder of Sherman's. Lee began preparations for the movement and informed Confederate President Jefferson Davis and Confederate States Secretary of War John C. Breckinridge of his conclusions and plan.

Lee accepted Major General John B. Gordon's proposal to attempt to break the Union lines and threaten their supply base at City Point, Virginia by attacking along a narrow front near Fort Stedman, east of Petersburg and south of the Appomattox River, in order to compel Grant to shorten his lines, at least temporarily. If successful, this could give Lee an opportunity to shorten his lines and an opening and head start in a movement to the west and toward North Carolina.

After Gordon's Confederates surprise attack on Fort Stedman in the pre-dawn hour of March 25, 1865 had some initial success, a Union counterattack at the Battle of Fort Stedman recaptured the fort and forced the Confederates to return to their lines and give up their advance picket line, including much of the western part of that line in the afternoon at the Battle of Jones's Farm. The Confederates suffered about 4,000 casualties which they could ill afford. After the defeat at Fort Stedman, Lee knew that he could not detach part of his army and be able to maintain the defenses of Petersburg and Richmond. He also knew that Grant would soon move against the only remaining Confederate supply lines to Petersburg, the Southside Railroad and the Boydton Plank Road, beyond the end of his current defenses.

=== Grant's orders ===
Grant already had issued orders on March 24, 1865, for an offensive to begin on March 29 and was not deterred by the Battle of Fort Stedman. Grant planned for Sheridan's cavalry to cut the remaining open railroads, the Southside Railroad and the Richmond and Danville Railroad to Richmond, and for the infantry to turn the Confederates out of their positions if possible. On March 28, Grant told Sheridan to lead his troops around the Confederate right flank and to fight the Confederates, with infantry support, if the Confederates came out of their trenches. Otherwise, Sheridan should wreck the railroads as much as possible and either return to the Petersburg lines or join Sherman in North Carolina at his discretion. (Note: Sheridan had no desire or intention to go to North Carolina. Grant assured him that was not Grant's plan and Sheridan had the discretion to join Sherman only if he needed it. Greene, 2008, p. 151.)

Grant ordered two corps of the Army of the Potomac, the V Corps under Major General Gouverneur K. Warren and the II Corps under Major General Andrew A. Humphreys, to support Sheridan on his right flank, to the east of his objectives. Grant wanted these infantry corps to outflank the Confederates in their defenses and prevent them from interfering with Sheridan's mission, pushing them back to their lines if they came out to fight. Warren's corps initially also was ordered to seize Dinwiddie Court House, Virginia, which also would capture a portion of the Boydton Plank Road at that location, but later that task was given to Sheridan.

Under Grant's order, on the night of March 27–28, Major General Edward Ord, quietly moved units from the Army of the James, including two divisions of Major General John Gibbon's XXIV Corps, a division of Major General Godfrey Weitzel's XXV Corps and Brigadier General Ranald S. Mackenzie's cavalry division from the Richmond lines to fill in the Petersburg lines to be vacated by the II Corps when they moved to support Sheridan. Confederate Lieutenant General James Longstreet's corps defending the Richmond lines failed to detect Ord's movement, thus limiting the number of men Lee could move to counter the movement of Grant's forces without fatally weakening the Richmond lines.

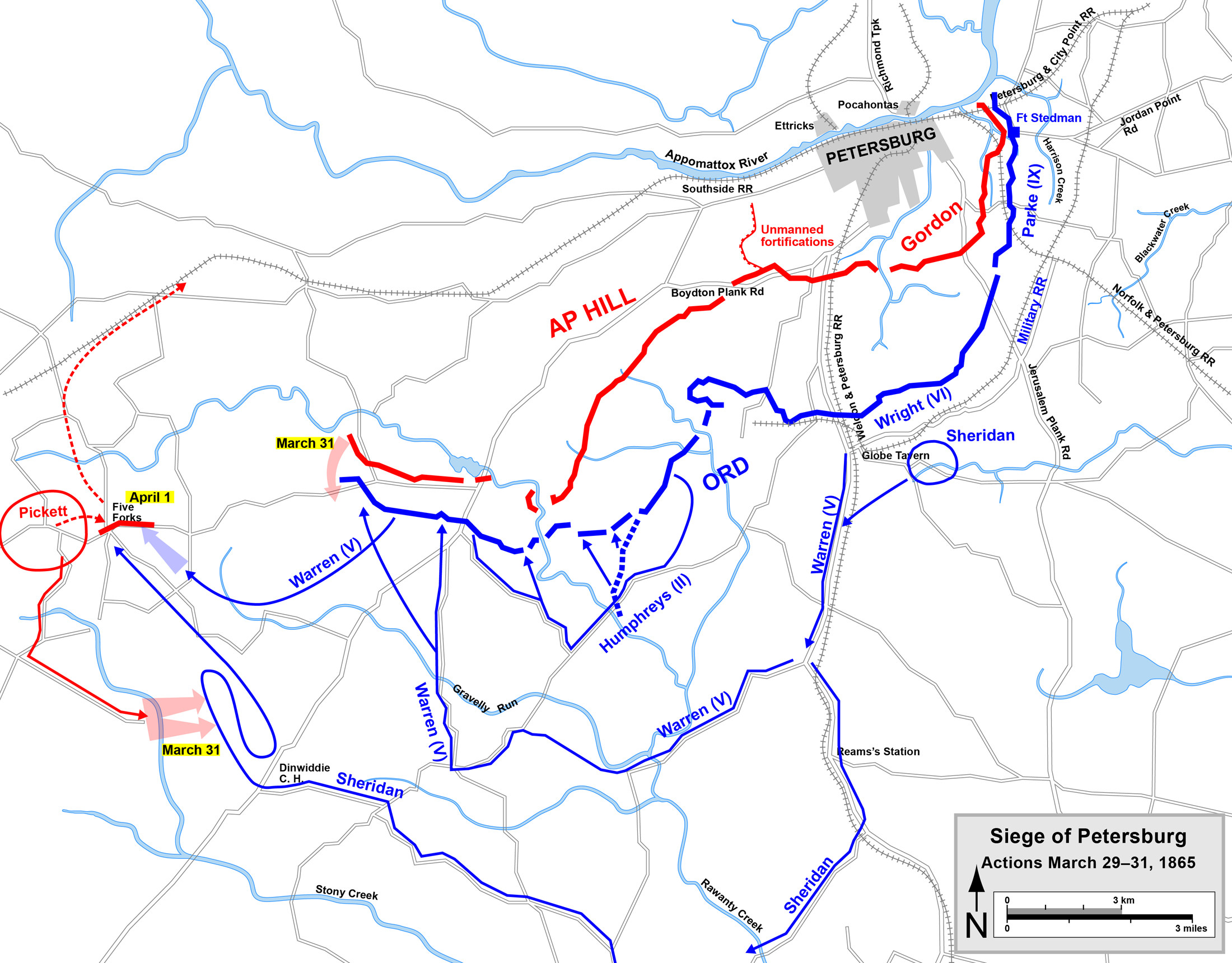
Actions at Petersburg before and during the Battle of Five Forks

=== Description of area roads ===
A good verbal description of the roads and positions in the area, given by Brigadier General Joshua Chamberlain in his 1915 book The Passing of the Armies, is recited in the footnote. (Note: The principal road leading out westerly from Petersburg is the Boydton Plank Road, for the first ten miles nearly parallel with the Appomattox [River], and distant from it from three to six miles. The Southside Railroad is between the Boydton Road and the river. South of the Boydton is the Vaughan Road; the first section lying in rear of our main entrenchments, but from our extreme left at Hatcher's Run inclining towards the Boydton Road, being only two miles distant from it to Dinwiddie Court House. Five miles east of this place the Quaker Road, called by persons of another mood, the "Military Road," crosses the Vaughan and leads northerly into the Boydton Road midway between Hatcher's Run and Gravelly Run, which at this junction became Rowanty Creek. A mile above the intersection of the Quaker Road with the Boydton is the White Oak Road, leading off from the Boydton at right angles westerly, following the ridges between the small streams and branches, forming the headwaters of Hatcher's and Gravelly Runs, through and beyond the "Five Forks." This is a meeting place of roads, the principal of which, called the Ford Road, crosses the White Oak at a right angle, leading from a station on the Southside Railroad, three miles north, to Dinwiddie Court House, six miles south. The enemy's main line entrenchments west from Petersburg covered the important Boydton Plank Road, but only so far as Hatcher's Run, where at Burgess' Mill their entrenchments leave this and follow the White Oak Road for some two miles, then cross it, turning to the north and following the Claiborne Road, which leads to Sutherland's Station on the Southside Railroad ten miles distant from Petersburg, covering this road till it strikes Hatcher's Run about a mile higher up. This "return" northerly forms the extreme right of the enemy's entrenched line. Chamberlain, Joshua L. The Passing of Armies: An Account of the Final Campaign of the Army of the Potomac. New York: Bantam Books, 1993. ISBN 978-0-553-29992-2. pp. 31–32. First published New York and London, G.P. Putnam's Sons, 1915.)

=== Initial movements: March 29 ===
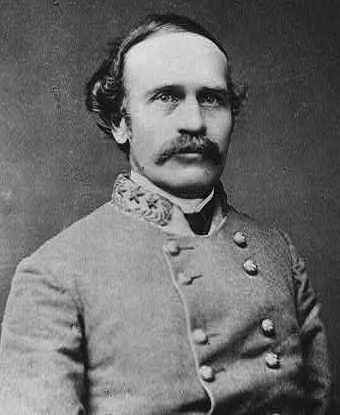
Major General Bushrod Johnson

Warren's V Corps of over 17,000 men moved from their reserve position south of the Union front line on the Stage Road at 3:00 a.m. on March 29, crossed Rowanty Creek and proceeded west on Vaughan Road to the intersection with Quaker Road. Warren reported to his immediate superior, Major General George G. Meade, who remained in direct tactical command of the Army of the Potomac, that Dinwiddie Court House was undefended. By 8:45 a.m., Meade sent an order to Warren which arrived at 10:20 a.m., and told Warren to advance in strength on the Quaker Road across Gravelly Run and contact the II Corps to his right. Warren misunderstood or ignored the order and sent only Brigadier General Joshua Chamberlain's brigade up the Quaker Road until noon. (Note: Bearss says that Warren misunderstood the order. Bearrs, 2014, p. 333.) Then Warren sent other units forward in response to a second order from Meade.

The II Corps moved from Hatcher's Run at about 6:30 a.m. Humphreys was careful not to leave a gap between his corps at Hatcher's Run and the troops of the XXIV Corps which took the positions in the Union line that were being vacated by the II Corps. Meade wanted the V Corps to move up the Quaker Road to prevent a gap developing between the V Corps and the II Corps.

After having moved over the Vaughan Road to within 2 miles (3.2 km) of Dinwiddie Court House, Chamberlain's brigade marched a short distance back to the Quaker Road and led the Union advance north on that road, as Meade had ordered Warren. After leading the brigade about 1.5 miles (2.4 km) north on Quaker Road, Chamberlain's skirmishers reported that the bridge over Gravelly Run had been destroyed and that Confederates were entrenched on the other side.

Confederate Lieutenant General Richard H. Anderson, as a corps commander of only the division of Major General Bushrod Johnson, was stationed on the Confederate right flank west of Petersburg at Hatcher's Run about 4 miles (6.4 km) east of Five Forks and immediately south of Sutherland Station. When Confederate scouts reported that a large force of Union infantry was moving north on Quaker Road, Anderson ordered Johnson to drive them back to Vaughan Road. Three Confederate regiments of the brigade commanded by Brigadier General Henry A. Wise, followed by the brigades of Brigadier Generals William H. Wallace, Young Marshall Moody and Matt Whitaker Ransom, moved south on the Quaker Road and the Boydton Plank Road with the intent of carrying out the order.

== Battle ==
=== Fighting begins ===
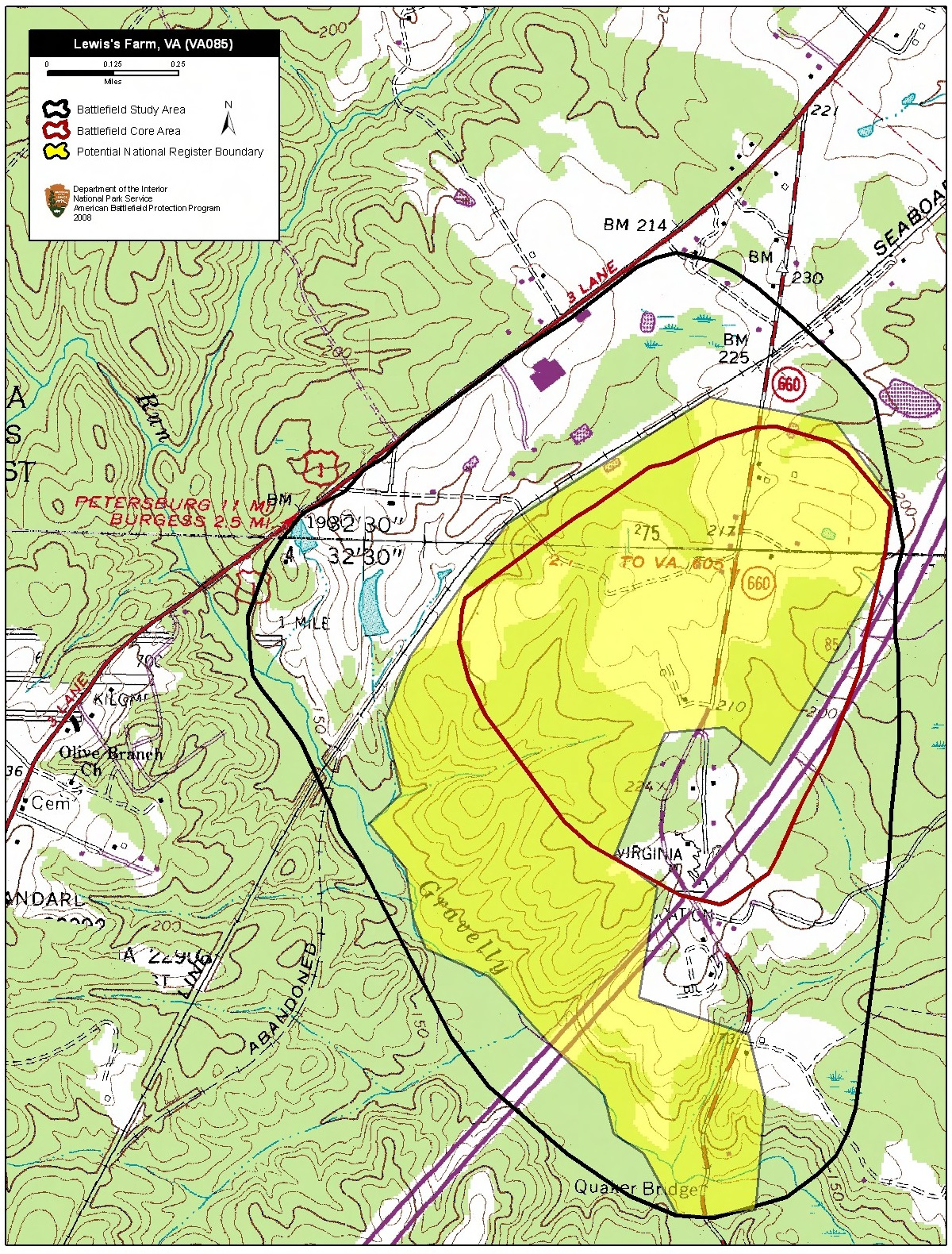
Map of Lewis's Farm Battlefield core and study areas by the American Battlefield Protection Program.

Chamberlain placed the 198th Pennsylvania Infantry on the right side of the road to fire on the Confederates as a diversion while he led the 185th New York Volunteer Infantry across Gravelly Run to attack the Confederate right flank where a hand-to-hand fight developed. Both Union regiments were oversize for that time period with about 1,000 officers and men. The rest of Chamberlain's brigade crossed the stream following the New Yorkers' attack. The Confederates retreated to the Lewis farmhouse clearing about 1 mile (1.6 km) further north on the Quaker Road. After a stand near the farmhouse, the Confederates moved back into the woods where they were reinforced by other Confederate soldiers behind breastworks. Here, the Confederates drove back the advancing Union skirmishers but not without losing about 100 men as prisoners. Chamberlain brought the rest of his men forward and the Confederates who had moved out to meet the skirmishers again returned to their works.

=== Chamberlain wounded; rallies his men ===
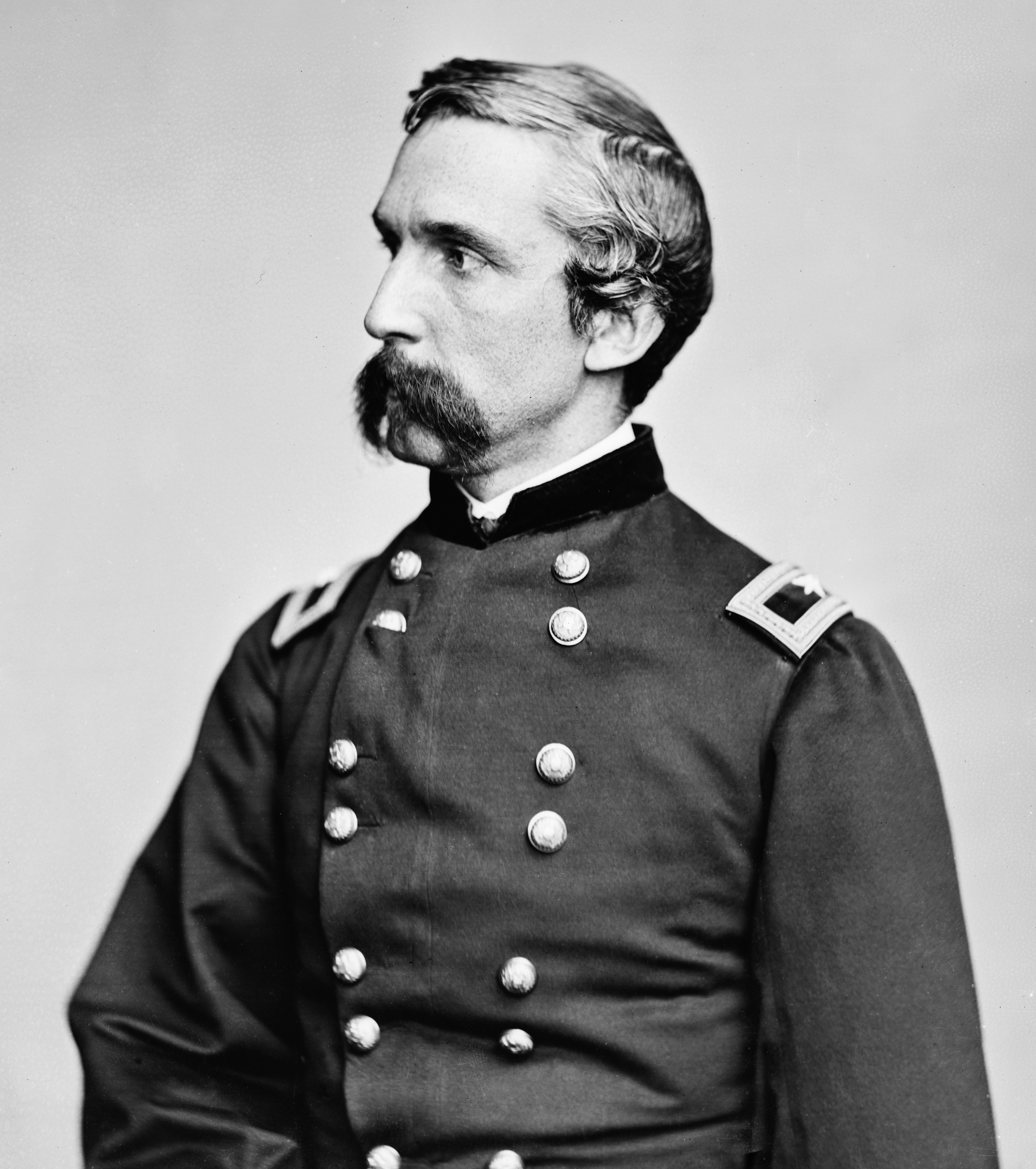
Brigadier General Joshua Chamberlain

After a pause in the fighting, Chamberlain's division commander, Brigadier General (Brevet Major General) Charles Griffin came forward and told Chamberlain that the Confederate position must be taken. Deploying men to both sides of the Quaker Road, Chamberlain, on horseback, led a charge up the Quaker Road toward the Confederate strong point, a large sawdust pile that provided cover for many Confederate soldiers. Chamberlain got ahead of his men and became an obvious target. He was wounded in the arm and his horse was wounded in the neck. (Note: The same bullet deflected off some papers and a pocket mirror with a brass back in Chamberlain's coat pocket near his heart, then hit his aide, Lieutenant Vogel, in his pistol and knocked him from his horse. Chamberlain, 1915, p. 35.) Chamberlain slumped on his horse, initially unconscious, but regained consciousness in time to respond to General Griffin who had come up to check on Chamberlain's condition. Then Chamberlain rallied his Pennsylvania regiment who were retreating from a Confederate charge. When his wounded horse could not continue, Chamberlain went to the front of his line on foot. Several Confederate soldiers soon appeared and demanded Chamberlain's surrender. Chamberlain had lost his hat and was wearing a faded coat, almost gray in color. Pretending to be a Confederate officer, he led the Confederates back toward Union soldiers who promptly captured them.

=== Union reinforcements drive back Confederates ===
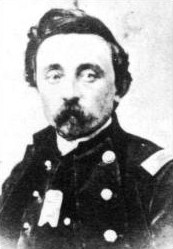
Colonel (Brevet Brigadier General) Alfred L. Pearson

After another brief pause, Chamberlain saw that his New York regiment was being driven back from an attempt to take the Confederate works in the woods ahead. Chamberlain and the regiment's officers steadied the men and soon they pushed the Confederates back until Union artillery under Regular Army Lieutenant John Mitchell came up with four guns to support them. Despite the artillery fire, the Confederates tried to outflank and charge the Union position. Chamberlain's men and the artillery held the position, but then the Confederates charged the Pennsylvania troops in the center and on the right of the Union position. These Union soldiers were nearly out of ammunition and began to slowly retreat.

As Chamberlain's line was falling back, his First Brigade was reinforced by the 188th New York Volunteer Infantry Regiment and the 155th Pennsylvania Volunteer Infantry Regiment (Zouaves) of Colonel (Brevet Brigadier General) Edgar M. Gregory's Second Brigade. Colonel (Brevet Brigadier General) Alfred L. Pearson led the Pennsylvanians to the center and toward the sawdust pile that the Confederates were using for cover. Pearson grabbed the regimental colors and charged toward the sawdust pile with his men following and passing through the ranks of the exhausted First Brigade. Thirty-two years later, Pearson was awarded the Medal of Honor for his actions at Lewis's Farm. (Note: Pearson's Medal of Honor citation reads: "At Lewis' Farm, Va., 29 March 1865, Seeing a brigade forced back by the enemy, he seized his regimental color, called on his men to follow him, and advanced upon the enemy under a severe fire. The whole brigade took up the advance, the lost ground was regained, and the enemy was repulsed. Date of issue: 17 September 1897.")

When they saw these Union reinforcements, the Confederates retreated to their main entrenchments along White Oak Road, abandoning control of the Boydton Plank Road and leaving behind badly wounded men and some others who surrendered. Chamberlain then positioned his men along with the artillery battery on either side and in front of the Lewis farm buildings.

=== Number engaged; casualties ===
Chamberlain wrote that he had fewer than 1,700 officers and men in his brigade and that his reinforcements numbered about 1,000. He wrote that the Confederates had 6,277 effective officers and men in Johnson's Division according to their morning report. (Note: Although he notes that Ransom's brigade moved out to meet Chamberlain's advance, Historian A. Wilson Greene does not identify that unit from Johnson's division as among the brigades he states were in the fighting. Greene, 2009, p. 158.) He stated that he lost about a quarter of his men while the Confederate total loss was "slight in numbers," although in a paragraph after this statement he said that he saw that evening 150 dead and severely wounded Confederates lying around the breastworks and noted that almost 200 prisoners had been taken by his brigade. Modern casualty estimates are 381 for the Union force and 371 for the Confederates.

== Aftermath ==
=== Union positions ===
Warren was able to take a position near the junction of the Quaker Road and the Boydton Plank Road. Griffin's division and Brigadier General Samuel Crawford's division taking up positions along the Boydton Plank Road, the Union movements on March 29 and Chamberlain's success in taking the Lewis Farm position enabled the Union Army to cut this important communication and supply road and to set up to attack the White Oak Road Line. Having to deal with muddy roads over a longer route, Sheridan's cavalry divisions reached Dinwiddie Court House at about 5:00 p.m. on March 29, 1865. Sheridan put troops of Devin's and Crook's divisions into position to guard the Vaughan Road, Flat Foot Road, Boydton Plank Road and Adams Road.

=== Grant's change in orders ===
Encouraged by the Confederate failure to press their attack at Lewis's Farm and their withdrawal to their White Oak Road Line, Grant decided to expand Sheridan's mission to a major offensive rather than just a railroad raid and forced extension of the Confederate line. He wrote in his letter to Sheridan: "I now feel like ending the matter...."

=== Lee's actions ===
Lee had anticipated that with the Confederate defeat at Fort Stedman and the arrival of Sheridan's cavalry at Petersburg, Grant would make a move on Lee's right flank such as Grant had ordered on March 24. Lee had only 6,000 cavalry north of the James River or at Stony Creek Depot, 18 miles (29 km) south of Petersburg and about 5,000 effective infantry that he could send to extend his line to the west to counter the anticipated Union movement. In the morning on March 29, Lee prepared to have Major General George Pickett take this force to Sutherland Station and move to protect Five Forks in Dinwiddie County. Lee ordered Pickett to take the brigades of Brigadier Generals William R. Terry, Montgomery Corse and George H. Steuart on the Southside Railroad to Sutherland Station, 10 miles (16 km) west of Petersburg, and he ordered Brigadier General Eppa Hunton to be ready to move to reinforce Pickett or to defend the junction of the Southside and Richmond and Danville Railroads at Burkeville, Virginia. Lee also ordered Major General Fitzhugh Lee to take his cavalry division to Sutherland Station and join with the cavalry divisions of Major Generals Rooney Lee and Thomas L. Rosser. Fitzhugh Lee was ordered to take command of the combined cavalry. General Lee thought that Pickett might be able to extend the Confederate line from its right flank 4 miles (6.4 km) east of Five Forks to Five Forks.

The Union Army movement on March 29 troubled Lee so he ordered additional movements to strengthen his right flank. Besides moving Brigadier General Samuel McGowan's brigade farther west to extend Johnson's line along White Oak Road, he thinned the White Oak Road line further by moving Brigadier General William MacRae's brigade to the west. After arriving at Sutherland Station on the night of March 29, as ordered, Pickett moved his three brigades under Brigadier Generals George H. Steuart and Montgomery Corse and William R. Terry's Brigade, and Brigadier Generals Matt Ransom's and William Henry Wallace's brigades from Johnson's division, a cavalry division under Major General Fitzhugh Lee and six guns under the command of Colonel William Pegram to Five Forks on March 30. Then he sent Terry's brigade and Corse's brigade to the south. Nonetheless, a gap continued to exist between Pickett's force and McGowan's brigade at the end of the Confederate White Oak Road Line. Lee ordered Hunton's brigade to stand in reserve near Manchester, Virginia where it could support Pickett or move by rail to defend the junction of the Southside Railroad and Richmond and Danville Railroad at Burkeville, Virginia if a Union force moved to attack it.

=== March 30, 1865 action ===
Rain poured down on the area all night on March 29 and continued the following day, which limited the fighting on that day. Sheridan later stated that Grant thought about suspending operations altogether until the weather cleared and the ground dried but Sheridan convinced him to press ahead. On March 30, half of Sheridan's cavalry under Brigadier General Thomas Devin skirmished with Confederate cavalry under Fitzhugh Lee. As they approached Five Forks, a patrol of the 6th United States Cavalry Regiment under Major Robert M. Morris encountered Fitzhugh Lee's troopers and lost 3 officers and 20 men in the encounter. The Confederates also suffered some casualties, including Brigadier General William H. F. Payne who was wounded. Skirmishing with and reacting to feints from Union patrols from the 6th Pennsylvania Cavalry under Colonel Charles L. Leiper delayed Pickett's force from reaching Five Forks until 4:30 p.m. Rosser's and Rooney Lee's cavalry divisions arrived even later.

Meanwhile, skirmishers from Warren's V Corps kept the Confederates in their White Oak Road Line between the Boydton Plank Road and Claiborne Road. Despite incomplete information and somewhat vague and conflicting orders from Meade and Grant, on Grant's order, Warren pushed the Union V Corps forward to strengthen his hold on a part of the Boydton Plank Road and the V Corps entrenched a line to cover that road from its intersection with Dabney Mill Road south to Gravelly Run. In the afternoon, Warren saw Griffin's men take over Confederate outposts but he also saw that movement further up the Boydton Plank Road was covered by Confederate artillery and fortifications.

Humphrey's II Corps closed the gap between the V Corps and the XXIV Corps. The latter corps captured a large part of the Confederate picket line.

Brigadier General Romeyn B. Ayres's division of the V Corps made a reconnaissance toward the White Oak Road a short distance west of Claiborne Road. The lead brigade under Colonel Frederick Winthrop crossed a swollen branch of Gravelly Run which was to feature in the following day's battle. Two other brigades did not cross but began to entrench. Ayres saw only empty space to the northeast and failed to see heavy fortifications near the intersection of White Oak Road and Claiborne Road which angled sharply back to Hatcher's Run directly to his north. As dark approached, Ayres had a number of outposts prepared to cover his position. Union casualties for the March 30 actions at the White Oak Line were 1 killed, 7 wounded and 15 missing; the number of Confederate casualties is unknown.

=== Prelude to March 31, 1865 battles ===
The fighting, maneuvering and skirmishing at Lewis's Farm on March 29, 1865, and in the vicinity of that farm along the White Oak Road Line on March 30, 1865, set the stage for the Battle of White Oak Road and the Battle of Dinwiddie Court House on March 31, 1865.
