= 146th New York Infantry Regiment =

- State flag from 1778 to 1901
- Active: October 10, 1862 (mustered in)–July 16, 1865 (mustered out)
- Disbanded: June 7, 1865
- Country: United States
- Allegiance: Union
- Branch: Infantry
- Size: Regiment
- Nickname(s): Garrard's Tigers aka 5th Oneida Regiment aka 'Halleck's Infantry
- Engagements: American Civil War: Fredericksburg; Chancellorsville; Gettysburg; Williamsport; Wilderness Tavern; Spotsylvania Court House; North Anna; Totopotomy Creek; Cold Harbor; Siege of Petersburg; Weldon Railroad; White Oak Ridge; Five Forks; Rappahannock Station; Bristoe Station; White Oak Swamp; Popular Springs Church; Hatcher's Run; Appomattox Court House

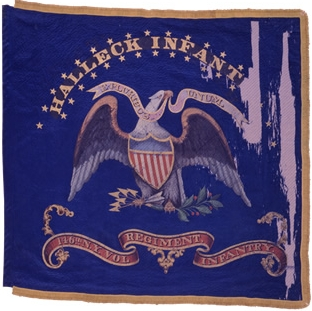
146th New York Infantry's Regimental Color

The 146th New York Infantry Regiment, nicknamed Garrard's Tigers, was a Federal regiment which mustered on October 10, 1862, and mustered out on July 16, 1865. The regiment was raised and organized in Rome, New York, and was known as the 5th Oneida Regiment. Another nickname for this unit was the Halleck's Infantry, after New York-born general Henry Halleck.

During the Appomattox Campaign, the regiment helped break the Confederate line at the decisive Battle of Five Forks where their commander, Colonel James G. Grindlay captured two battle flags. Grindlay was awarded the Medal of Honor along with David Edwards for their actions at Five Forks.

== Uniform ==
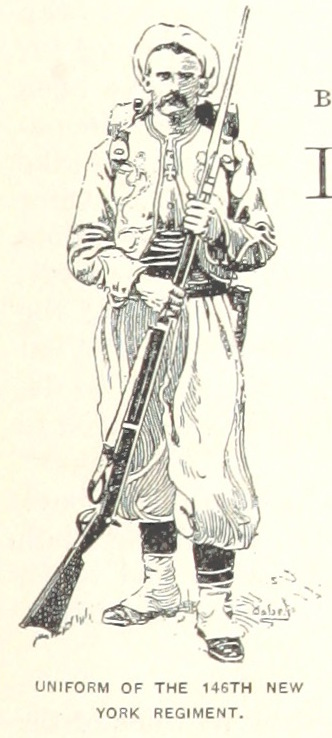
The zouave uniform of the 146th

This regiment at first wore the regular dark blue New York state jacket, light blue trousers, and dark blue forage cap, but when the veterans from 5th New York Volunteer Infantry Regiment, a famous Zouave unit, were transferred to the 146th New York, the regiment switched over to the colorful Zouave dress on 3 June 1863 at Falmouth, Va.

The zouave uniform consisted of large baggy trousers, blue in color, which were fastened at the knees; a fez cap, bright red in color, with red tassel; a long white turban which was wound around the hat, but worn only for dress parade; a red sash about ten feet long which was wound about the body and afforded a great comfort and warmth; and white cloth leggins (sic.) extending almost to the knees

The new uniform was not actually Zouave, but rather the colorful dress of the French-Turco style. Its most distinctive features were a sky blue zouave jacket with yellow trimming, a red fez with a yellow tassel, sky blue zouave pantaloons, and a red sash.

== Battle History ==
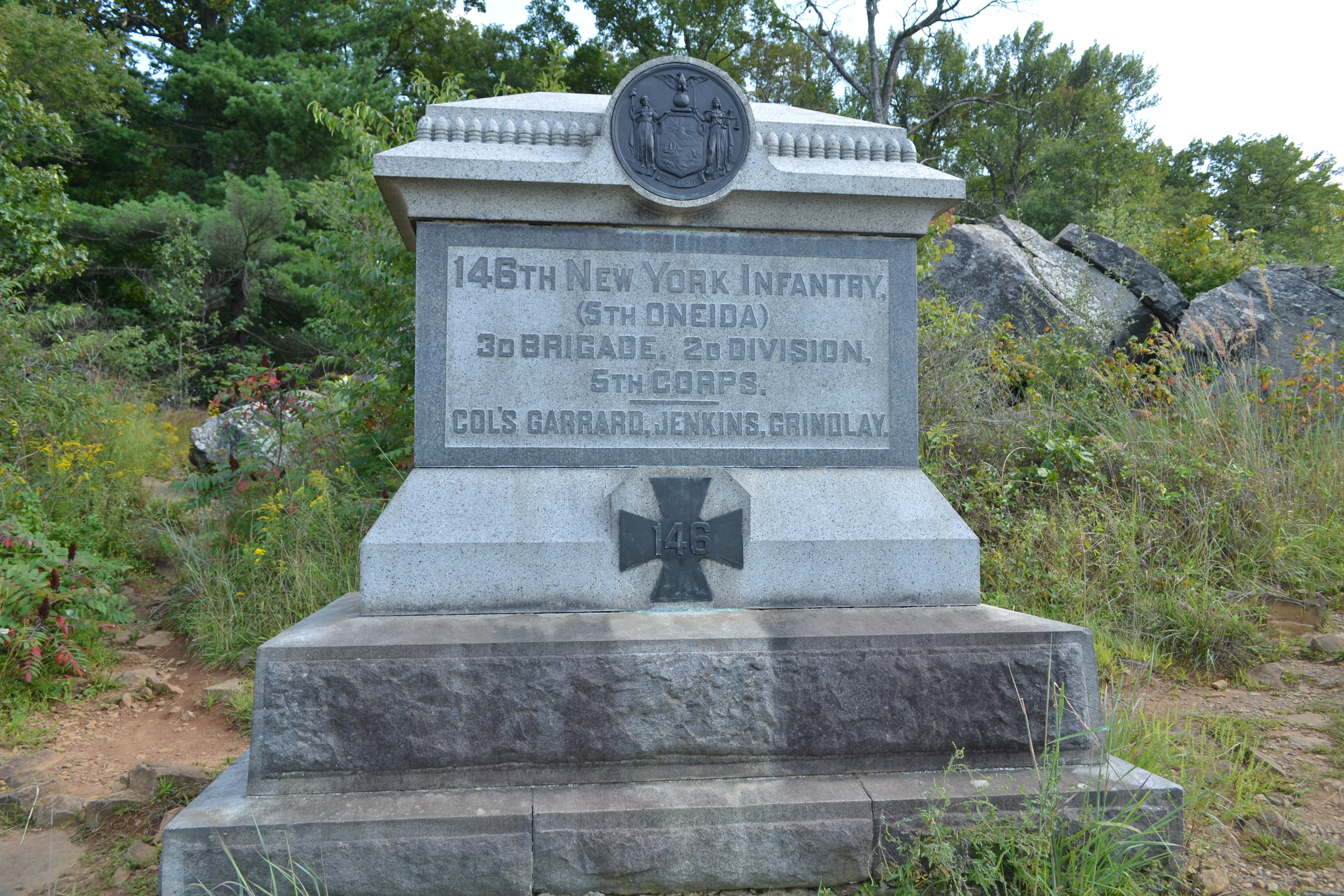
The monument to the 146th New York Volunteer Infantry at Gettysburg

The 146th New York participated in the battles of: Fredericksburg, Chancellorsville, Gettysburg, Williamsport, Wilderness Tavern, Spotsylvania Court House, North Anna, Totopotomy Creek, Cold Harbor, Siege of Petersburg, Weldon Railroad, White Oak Ridge, Five Forks, Rappahannock Station, Bristoe Station, White Oak Swamp, Popular Springs Church, Hatcher's Run, and Appomattox Court House.

== Casualties ==
The 146th New York suffered severe casualties by the end of the war. The regiment was nearly decimated at the battle of the Wilderness (Saunders Field) where many were cut off by the fires of the battle. Out of a number of 1,707 men, their losses were: 7 officers and 126 men killed in action and/or mortally wounded, 2 officers and 187 men who died of sickness and/or other things, and 1 officer and 87 men who died in captivity, many at the Andersonville prison camp.

== See also ==
- List of New York Civil War regiments
