= 17th Pennsylvania Cavalry Regiment =

American Civil War Union Army cavalry regiment

17th Pennsylvania Volunteer Cavalry
- Active: October 1862 to June 17, 1865
- Country: United States
- Allegiance: Union
- Branch: Union Army
- Role: Cavalry
- Engagements: American Civil War: Battle of Chancellorsville; Battle of Brandy Station; Battle of Gettysburg; Kilpatrick's Raid on Richmond; Battle of Trevilian Station; Sheridan's Shenandoah Valley Campaign; Appomattox Campaign

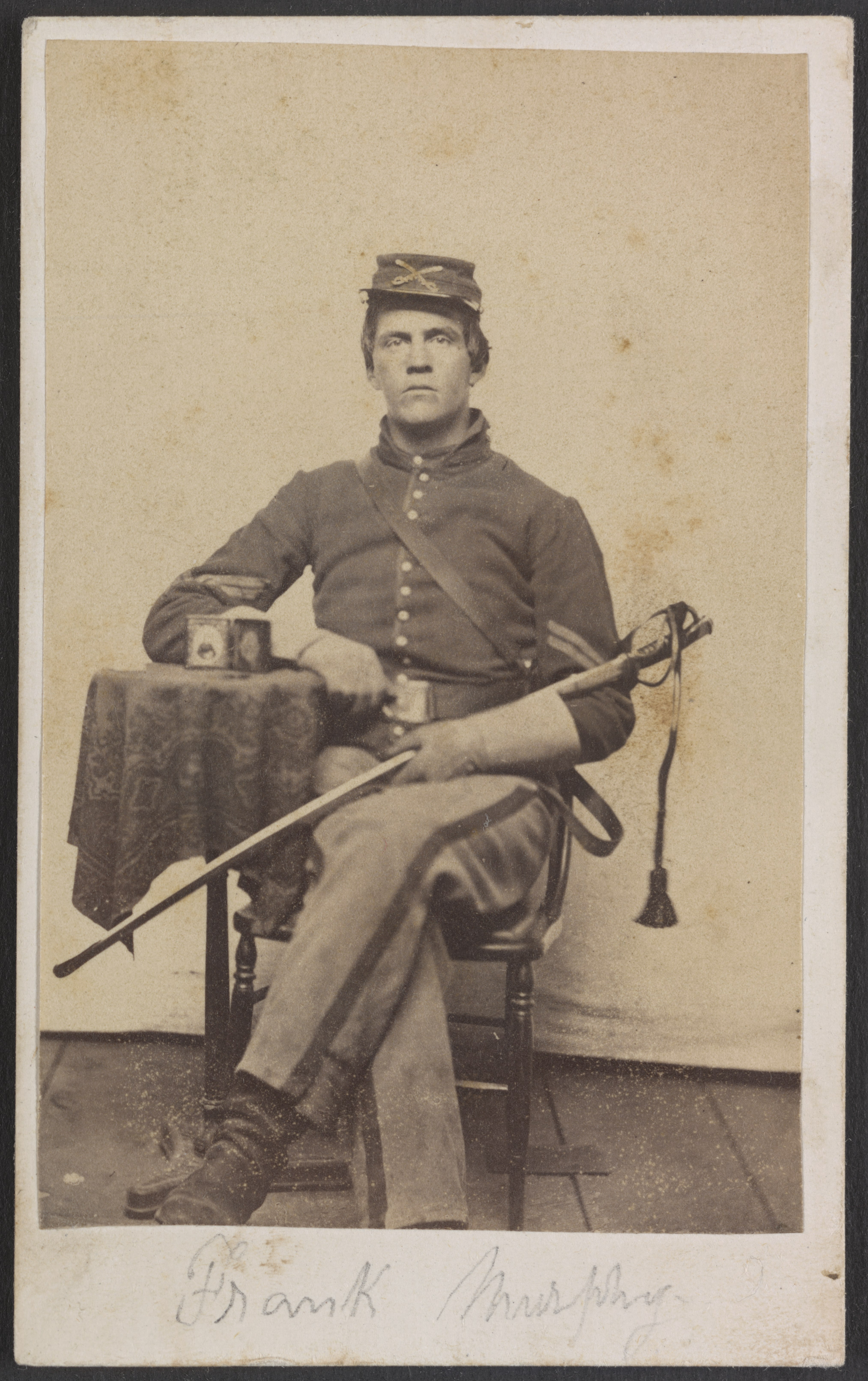
Private Frank H. Murphy of Co. B, 17th Pennsylvania Cavalry Regiment

The 17th Pennsylvania Cavalry Regiment (also known as the 162nd Regiment, Pennsylvania Volunteers) was a cavalry regiment in the Union Army during the American Civil War. It was the second regiment formed in response to President Abraham Lincoln's call July 2, 1862 requesting Pennsylvania furnish three cavalry regiments.

Troopers were recruited to form twelve companies: Company A in Beaver County; Company B in Susquehanna County; Company C in Lancaster County; Company D in Bradford County; Company E in Lebanon County; Company F in Cumberland County; Company G in Franklin County; Company H in Schuylkill County; Company I in Perry County and in the City of Philadelphia; Company K in Luzerne County; Company L in Montgomery County and Chester County; Company M in Wayne County.

Organization of the regiment was formalized October 18, 1862 at Camp Simmons, near Harrisburg, with the naming of officers, including Josiah H. Kellogg, Erie County, Colonel, a regular Army officer; John B. McAllister, Perry County, Lt. Colonel; David B. Hartranft, Montgomery County, Major;Coe Durland, Wayne County, Major; Reuben R. Reinhold, Lebanon County, Major.

== Service ==
1862: Camp at East Capital Hill, Defences of Washington, till December, 1862. Skirmish at Occoquan, Dumfries, Va., December 19. Occoquan December 19-20 and 27-28. Frying Pan, near Chantilly, December 29.

1863: Wiggenton's Mills February 6, 1863. Kelly's Ford April 28. Chancellorsville Campaign April 26-May 8. Rapidan River April 29.Chancellorsville April 30-May 6. Brandy Station and Beverly Ford June 9. Upperville June 21. Battle of Gettysburg, Pa., July 1-3. Williamsport, Md., July 6. Boonsboro July 8. Benevola or Beaver Creek July 9. Funkstown July 10-13. Falling Water July 14. Kelly's Ford July 30-August 1. Brandy Station August 1. Expedition from Leesburg August 30-September 2. Advance to the Rapidan September 13-17. Brandy Station and Culpeper C. H. September 13. Raccoon Ford September 14-16. Reconnaissance across the Rapidan September 21-23. Jack's Shop, Madison C. H., September 22. Bristoe Campaign October 9-22. Raccoon Ford and Morton's Ford October 10. Stevensburg October 11. Near Kelly's Ford October 11. Brandy Station or Fleetwood October 12. Oak Hill October 15. Advance to line of the Rappahannock November 7-8. Mine Run Campaign November 26-December 2. Parker's Store November 29.

1864: Demonstration on the Rapidan February 6-7, 1864. Kilpatrick's Raid on Richmond February 28-March 4. Fortifications of Richmond March 1. Ashland March 1. Reconnaissance to Madison C. H. April 23. Rapidan Campaign May-June. Wilderness May 5-7. Brock Road and the Furnaces May 6. Todd's Tavern May 7-8. Sheridan's Raid to the James River May 9-24. North Anna River May 9-10. Ground Squirrel Church and Yellow Tavern May 11. Meadow Bridge May 12. Line of the Pamunkey May 26-28. Hanovertown May 26. Hanovertown Ferry and Hanovertown May 27. Crump's Creek May 28. Haw's Shop May 28. Totopotomoy May 28-31. Old Church and Mattadequin Creek May 30. Bethesda Church, Cold Harbor, May 31-June 1. Bottom's Bridge June 1. Sheridan's Trevilian Raid June 7-24. Trevilian Station June 11-12. Newark or Mallory's Cross Roads June 12. White House or St. Peter's Church June 21. Black Creek or Tunstall Station June 21. Baltimore Cross Roads June 22. Jones' Bridge June 23. Demonstration on north side of the James at Deep Bottom July 27-29. Sheridan's Shenandoah Valley Campaign August 7-November 28. Toll Gate, near White Post, August 11. Near Newtown August 11. Cedarville, Guard Hill or Front Royal, August 16. Summit Point August 21. Kearneysville and Shepherdstown August 25. Leetown and Smithfield August 28. Smithfield Crossing of the Opequan August 29. Berryville September 6. Sevier's Ford, Opequan Creek, September 15. Battle of Opequan, Winchester, September 19. Middletown and Strasburg September 20. Near Winchester and Smithfield September 24. Fisher's Hill September 29 and October 1. Newtonia October 11. Winchester November 16. Expedition from Winchester into Fauquier and Loudoun Counties November 28-December 3. Expedition to Gordonsville December 19-28. Madison C. H. December 21. Liberty Mills December 22. Near Gordonsville December 23.

1865: Sheridan's Expedition from Winchester February 27-March 25, 1865. Occupation of Staunton March 2. Waynesboro March 2. Appomattox Campaign March 28-AprIl 9. Dinwiddie C. H. March 30-31. Five Forks April 1. Scott's Cross Roads April 2. Tabernacle Church or Beaver Pond Creek April 4. Sailor's Creek April 6. Appomattox Station April 8. Appomattox C. H. April 9. Surrender of Lee and his army. Expedition to Danville April 23-29. March to Washington, D. C., May. Grand Review May 23. Consolidated with 1st and 6th Pennsylvania Cavalry to form 2nd Provisional Cavalry June 17, 1865.

== Casualties ==
During its active service, the regiment lost 232 men: 6 Officers and 98 Enlisted men killed and mortally wounded and 128 Enlisted men by disease.

== Notable Members ==
Henry G. Bonebrake, of Waynesboro, Pennsylvania, serving as Lieutenant in Company G, was awarded the Medal of Honor for conspicuous bravery at the Battle of Five Forks, April 1, 1865, where he captured the flag from a confederate color-bearer in a hand-to-hand struggle.

== See also ==
- List of Pennsylvania Civil War regiments
- Pennsylvania in the Civil War
