= George J. Shopp =

U.S. Medal of Honor recipient

Corporal George J. Shopp
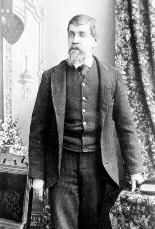
- Born: 8 September 1834; Dorst, Alsace, France
- Died: 24 March 1924 (aged 89); Denver, Colorado, US
- Burial place: Yuma Cemetery, Yuma, Colorado
- Military career
- Allegiance: United States
- Branch: Army
- Service years: 1861–1865
- Rank: Corporal
- Units: Company E, 191st Pennsylvania Infantry
- Conflicts: Five Forks, Virginia
- Awards: Medal of Honor

George J. Shopp (8 September 1834 – 24 March 1924) was a corporal in the United States Army who was awarded the Medal of Honor for gallantry at the Battle of Five Forks in Virginia during the American Civil War.

== Personal life ==
Shopp was born in the village of Dorst in Alsace, France on 8 September 1834. He immigrated to the United States at the age of 19 and worked on a farm for two years in Sullivan County, New York. He then purchased 50 acres of forest in Wayne County, Pennsylvania and married Mary Adaline Fish Shopp, fathering 6 children. He worked on his land as a lumberjack until May 1885, when the family moved westward, eventually settling in Yuma, Yuma County, Colorado in 1890. He moved to Denver in 1917 and wrote an autobiographical summary of his life in 1918. Shopp died on 24 March 1924 in Denver and was buried in Yuma Cemetery in Yuma.

== Military service ==
Shopp volunteered for the 6th Regiment, Pennsylvania Reserves on 10 May 1861 in Harrisburg, Pennsylvania. He was mustered into Company E of the 191st Pennsylvania Infantry on 13 May 1861 as a private and fought in the First and Second Battles of Bull Run. He was wounded at the Battle of South Mountain and was treated at a hospital in Frederick City, Maryland. He also fought at Chancellorsville, Arlington Heights, Gettysburg, Wilderness, Spotsylvania Court House, and several other battles in the eastern theatre. During this time, he was shot in the leg by a Confederate sharpshooter. He reenlisted in the Army on 12 February 1864 with veteran status. On 1 April 1865, during the Battle of Five Forks, Shopp captured a rebel flag under heavy fire and killed a Confederate officer. His Medal of Honor citation reads:

The President of the United States of America, in the name of Congress, takes pleasure in presenting the Medal of Honor to Private George J. Shopp, United States Army, for extraordinary heroism on 1 April 1865, while serving with Company E, 191st Pennsylvania Infantry, in action at Five Forks, Virginia, for capture of flag.

— E. M. Stanton, Secretary of War

Shopp was promoted to corporal on 1 June 1865 and was mustered out of the Army on 28 June 1865 in Washington D.C.
