= Jacob Koogle =

American Medal of Honor recipient (1841-1915)

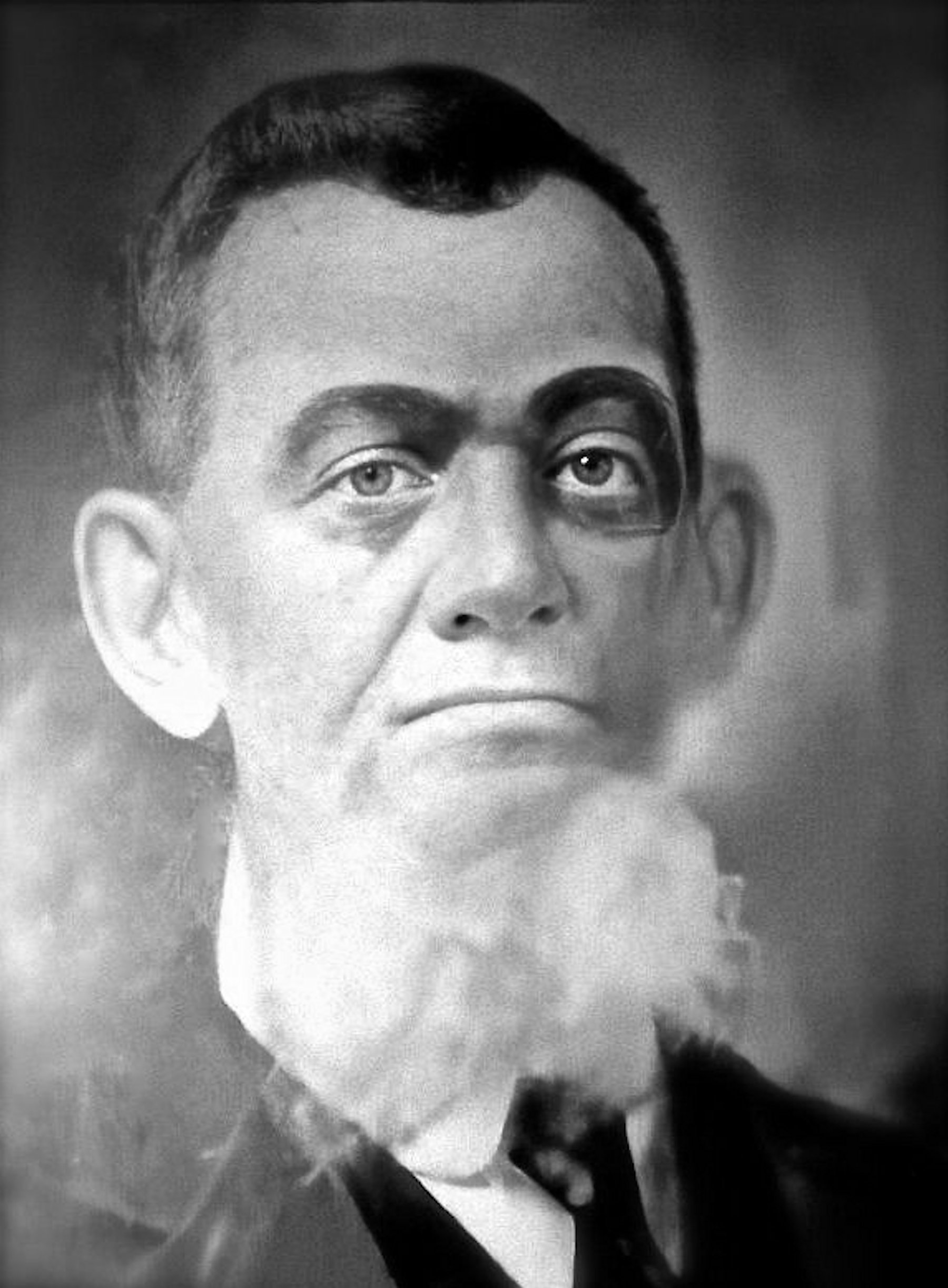
- Born: December 5, 1841; Frederick, Maryland, US
- Died: March 16, 1915 (aged 73)
- Burial place: Myersville, Maryland, US
- Military career
- Allegiance: United States of America
- Branch: United States Army
- Rank: First Lieutenant
- Units: Company G, 7th Maryland Infantry
- Conflicts: Battle of Five Forks; American Civil War
- Awards: Medal of Honor

Jacob Koogle (December 5, 1841 – March 16, 1915) was an American soldier who fought in the American Civil War. Koogle received the United States' highest award for bravery during combat, the Medal of Honor. Koogle's medal was won for capturing the flag at the Battle of Five Forks in Virginia on April 1, 1865. He was honored with the award on May 10, 1865.

Koogle was born in Frederick, Maryland, and was buried in Myersville, Maryland.

== Medal of Honor citation ==
The President of the United States of America, in the name of Congress, takes pleasure in presenting the Medal of Honor to First Lieutenant (Infantry) Jacob Koogle, United States Army, for extraordinary heroism on 1 April 1865, while serving with Company G, 7th Maryland Infantry, in action at Five Forks, Virginia, for capture of battle flag.

== See also ==
- List of American Civil War Medal of Honor recipients: G–L
