= Henry G. Bonebrake =

Medal of Honor recipient (1838–1912)

- Born: June 21, 1838; Waynesboro, Pennsylvania
- Died: October 26, 1912 (aged 74); Waynesboro, Pennsylvania
- Burial place: Green Hill Cemetery
- Military career
- Allegiance: United States of America
- Branch: United States Army
- Rank: Lieutenant
- Units: 17th Pennsylvania Cavalry Regiment, Company G
- Conflicts: Battle of Five Forks
- Awards: Medal of Honor

Lieutenant Henry G. Bonebrake (June 21, 1838 - October 26, 1912) was an American soldier who fought in the American Civil War. Bonebrake received the country's highest award for bravery during combat, the Medal of Honor, for his action during the Battle of Five Forks in Virginia on 1 April 1865. He was honored with the award on 3 May 1865.

== Biography ==
Bonebrake was born in Waynesboro, Pennsylvania to Henry (1798–1879) and Anna Stewart Bonebrake (1804–1861). Before the war he attended schools in the Washington Township and then became a teacher.

Bonebrake enlisted into the 17th Pennsylvania Volunteer Cavalry on 12 September 1862. He was elected first sergeant and later commissioned second lieutenant and ultimately first lieutenant on 14 January 1865. During the Battle of Five Forks on 1 April 1865, Bonebrake spotted a color-bearer urging on his fellow Confederates. Bonebrake attempted to take the flag, during which time a fight ensued between the two resulting in Bonebrake capturing the flag. The flag, which then belonged to the 35th Regiment North Carolina State Troops, was later deposited at the War Department and labeled with capture number 340. He was presented with a Medal of Honor on 3 May 1865 for this act of bravery. He mustered out of the army on 21 June 1865, along with the rest of his company.

Following the war Bonebrake continued in teaching. He later got into farming, then owned a grocery store and was an assistant postmaster in 1898. He married twice, first to Cora Walters and then, after her death in 1899, to Clara Palm, who also died before him in 1909. Musician Dave Grohl is distantly related to Bonebrake.

Bonebrake was honored twice by Franklin County in 1987 and again in 2002 for earning the community's only Medal of Honor during the American Civil War. A bronze tablet was dedicated to his memory.

== Medal of Honor citation ==
As 1 of the first of Devin's Division to enter the works, he fought in a hand-to-hand struggle with a Confederate to capture his flag by superior physical strength.

== See also ==
- List of American Civil War Medal of Honor recipients: A–F
