= David Edwards (soldier) =

- Born: 1841; Wales
- Died: April 14, 1897 (aged 55–56); Waterville, New York
- Burial place: Waterville Cemetery
- Military career
- Allegiance: United States of America
- Branch: United States Army
- Service years: 1862 - 1865
- Rank: Corporal
- Units: (New York (state)) Company H, 146th New York Volunteer Infantry Regiment
- Conflicts: Battle of Five Forks
- Awards: Medal of Honor

Private David Edwards (1841 – April 14, 1897) was an American soldier who fought in the American Civil War. Edwards received the country's highest award for bravery during combat, the Medal of Honor, for his action during the Battle of Five Forks in Virginia on 1 April 1865. He was honored with the award on 10 May 1865.

== Biography ==
Edwards was born in Wales in 1841. He joined the 146th New York Infantry in September 1862, and mustered out with his regiment in July 1865. He died on 14 April 1897 and his remains are interred at the Waterville Cemetery in Waterville, New York.

== Medal of Honor citation ==
The President of the United States of America, in the name of Congress, takes pleasure in presenting the Medal of Honor to Private David Edwards, United States Army, for extraordinary heroism on 1 April 1865, while serving with Company H, 146th New York Infantry, in action at Five Forks, Virginia, for capture of flag.

== See also ==
- List of American Civil War Medal of Honor recipients: A–F
