= Robert F. Shipley =

First Sergeant Robert Frank Shipley
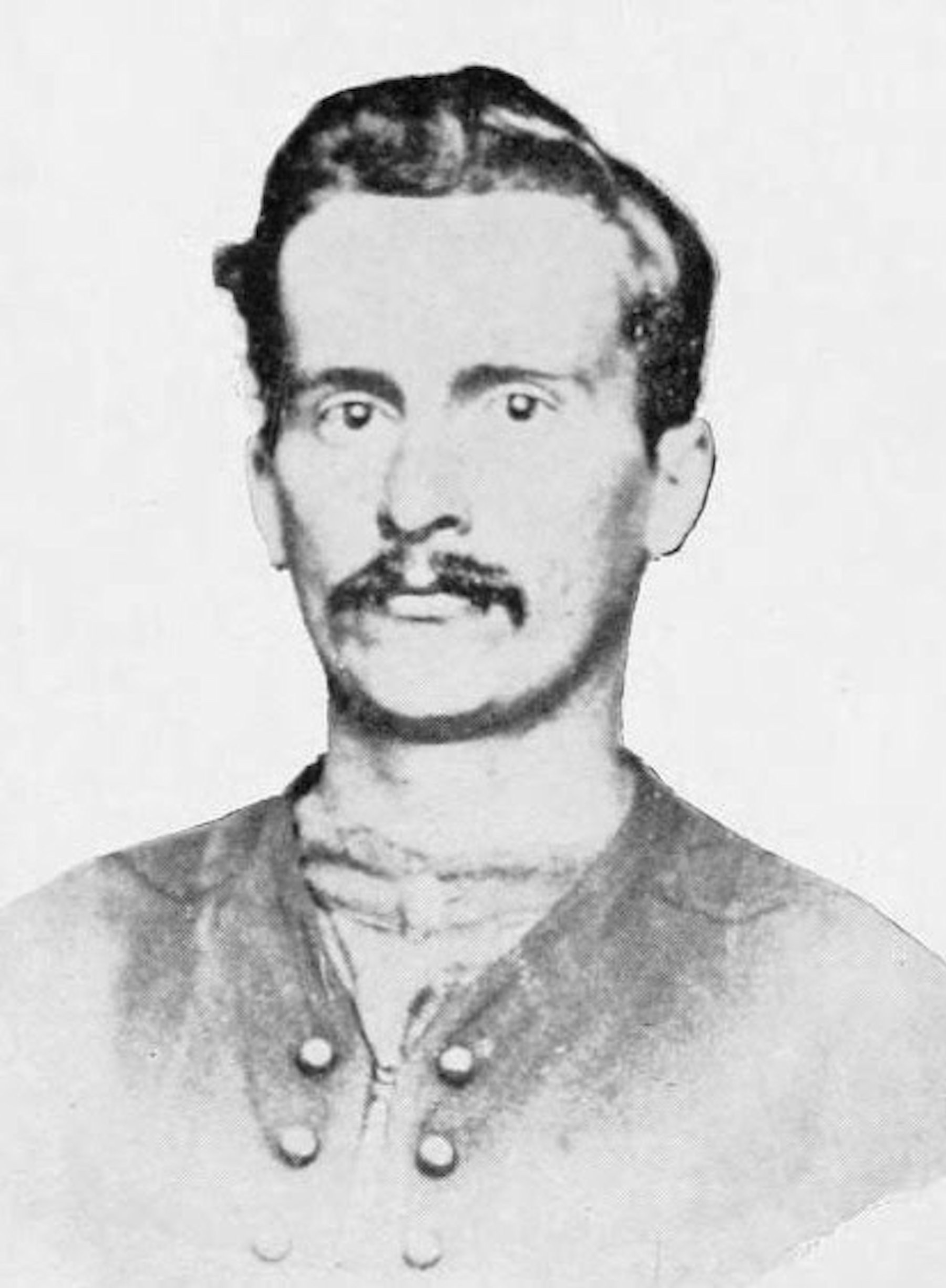
- Born: 8 May 1838; Wayne County, New York
- Died: 29 April 1903 (aged 64); Mendota, Illinois
- Burial place: Restland Cemetery, Mendota, Illinois
- Military career
- Allegiance: United States
- Branch: Army
- Service years: 1862-1865
- Rank: First Sergeant
- Units: Company C, 44th New York Infantry Company A, 140th New York Infantry Company I, 5th New York Veteran Infantry
- Conflicts: Battle of Five Forks
- Awards: Medal of Honor

Robert Frank Shipley (8 May 1838 - 29 April 1903) was a first sergeant in the United States Army who was awarded the Medal of Honor for gallantry during the American Civil War. Shipley was awarded the medal on 10 May 1865 for actions performed at the Battle of Five Forks in Virginia on 1 April 1865.

== Personal life ==
Shipley was born on 8 May 1838 in Wayne County, New York, to parents James Shipley and Hannah Sampson Shipley. He was one of four children. He married Almeda Cairns Shipley and fathered two children. He died on 29 April 1903 in Mendota, Illinois, and was buried in Restland Cemetery in Mendota.

== Military service ==
Shipley enlisted in the Army as a corporal on 14 August 1862 at Penn Yan, New York, and was mustered into Company C of the 44th New York Infantry on 3 October 1862. He was promoted to sergeant on 15 November 1863 and to first sergeant at an unknown time later. On 11 October 1864, he was transferred to Company A of the 140th New York Infantry. On 1 April 1865, during a charge on Confederate defenses, Shipley encountered a color bearer of the 9th Virginia Infantry and secured the flag by bayonetting its holder.

Shipley's Medal of Honor citation reads:

The President of the United States of America, in the name of Congress, takes pleasure in presenting the Medal of Honor to First Sergeant Robert F. Shipley, United States Army, for extraordinary heroism on 1 April 1865, while serving with Company A, 140th New York Infantry, in action at Five Forks, Virginia. First Sergeant Shipley captured the flag of the 9th Virginia Infantry (Confederate States of America) in hand-to-hand combat.

— E. M. Stanton, Secretary of War

Shipley was transferred to Company I of the 5th New York Veteran Infantry on 31 May 1865 and was mustered out of the Army at Hart's Island, New York Harbor, New York on 21 August 1865.
