= National Register of Historic Places listings in Dinwiddie County, Virginia =

Location of Dinwiddie County in Virginia

This is a list of the National Register of Historic Places listings in Dinwiddie County, Virginia.

This is intended to be a complete list of the properties and districts on the National Register of Historic Places in Dinwiddie County, Virginia, United States. The locations of National Register properties and districts for which the latitude and longitude coordinates are included below, may be seen in an online map.

There are 19 properties and districts listed on the National Register in the county, including 2 National Historic Landmarks. Another property was once listed but has been removed.

This National Park Service list is complete through NPS recent listings posted March 6, 2026.

== Current listings ==
	Name on the Register	Image	Date listed	Location	City or town	Description
1	Burlington	Burlington	April 30, 1976 (#76002102)	West of Petersburg off Ferndale Rd. 37°13′23″N 77°28′15″W	Petersburg	
2	Burnt Quarter	Burnt Quarter	November 25, 1969 (#69000235)	Southwest of the junction of Courthouse, White Oak, and Wheelers Pond Rds. 37°07′57″N 77°37′59″W	Dinwiddie	
3	Butterwood Methodist Church and Butterwood Cemetery	Butterwood Methodist Church and Butterwood Cemetery	April 11, 2003 (#03000213)	State Route 40; 37°04′22″N 77°51′39″W	Blackstone	
4	Conover Archaeological Site		March 28, 1985 (#85000647)	Address Restricted	Carson	
5	Dinwiddie County Court House	Dinwiddie County Court House	March 21, 1973 (#73002008)	Junction of U.S. Route 1 and Courthouse Rd. 37°04′38″N 77°35′13″W	Dinwiddie	
6	Five Forks Battlefield	Five Forks Battlefield	October 15, 1966 (#66000830)	12 miles west of Petersburg on Courthouse Rd. at Church Rd. 37°08′29″N 77°36′48″W	Petersburg	
7	Mansfield	Mansfield	May 28, 1976 (#76002103)	West of Petersburg on Mark Dr. 37°13′15″N 77°29′18″W	Petersburg	
8	Mayfield Cottage	Mayfield Cottage	November 12, 1969 (#69000236)	Central State Hospital grounds 37°12′56″N 77°26′53″W	Petersburg	
9	Montrose	Montrose	August 11, 2004 (#04000855)	19216 Old White Oak Rd. 37°00′29″N 77°46′38″W	McKenney	
10	Petersburg Breakthrough Battlefield	Petersburg Breakthrough Battlefield	February 17, 2006 (#06000239)	Junction of Duncan and Boydton Plank Rds. 37°11′32″N 77°27′57″W	Petersburg	Site of the Third Battle of Petersburg.
11	Petersburg Breakthrough Battlefield Historic District at Pamplin Historical Park	Petersburg Breakthrough Battlefield Historic District at Pamplin Historical Park	October 22, 2003 (#03001095)	6125 Boydton Plank Rd. and 6619 Duncan Rd. 37°10′37″N 77°28′37″W	Petersburg	A portion of the site of the Third Battle of Petersburg.
12	Petersburg National Battlefield	Petersburg National Battlefield	October 15, 1966 (#66000831)	Southeast, south, and southwest of Petersburg; 37°11′53″N 77°27′06″W	Petersburg	
13	Rocky Branch School		January 2, 2026 (#100012479)	6009 Rocky Branch Road; 37°11′23″N 77°34′27″W	Sutherland	
14	Rose Bower	Rose Bower	February 5, 1991 (#91000020)	Walkers Mill Rd., south of its junction with State Route 40; 36°56′08″N 77°32′57″W	Stony Creek	
15	Sappony Church	Sappony Church	April 30, 1976 (#76002101)	South of Sappony Creek off Sapony Church Rd. 36°58′15″N 77°38′09″W	McKenney	
16	Stony Creek Plantation	Stony Creek Plantation	April 11, 2003 (#03000212)	Hills Rd. 37°05′34″N 77°39′32″W	DeWitt	
17	Wales	Wales	December 23, 1974 (#74002115)	West of Petersburg off Butterwood Rd. 37°11′22″N 77°30′34″W	Petersburg	
18	Williamson Site	Williamson Site	December 3, 1969 (#69000237)	5 miles (8.0 km) east of Dinwiddie Court House; 37°04′28″N 77°29′51″W	Dinwiddie	
19	Zehmer Farm	Zehmer Farm	September 30, 2009 (#09000793)	9818 Jack Zehmer Rd. 36°59′05″N 77°43′57″W	McKenney	

== Former listings ==
	Name on the Register	Image	Date listed	Date removed	Location	City or town	Description
1	Central State Hospital Chapel	Central State Hospital Chapel	September 24, 2010 (#10000794)	February 7, 2017	West Washington Street Extended; 37°12′29″N 77°27′10″W	Petersburg	

== See also ==
- List of National Historic Landmarks in Virginia
- National Register of Historic Places listings in Virginia
- National Register of Historic Places listings in Petersburg, Virginia
