= Five Forks Battlefield =

- U.S. National Register of Historic Places
- U.S. National Historic Landmark
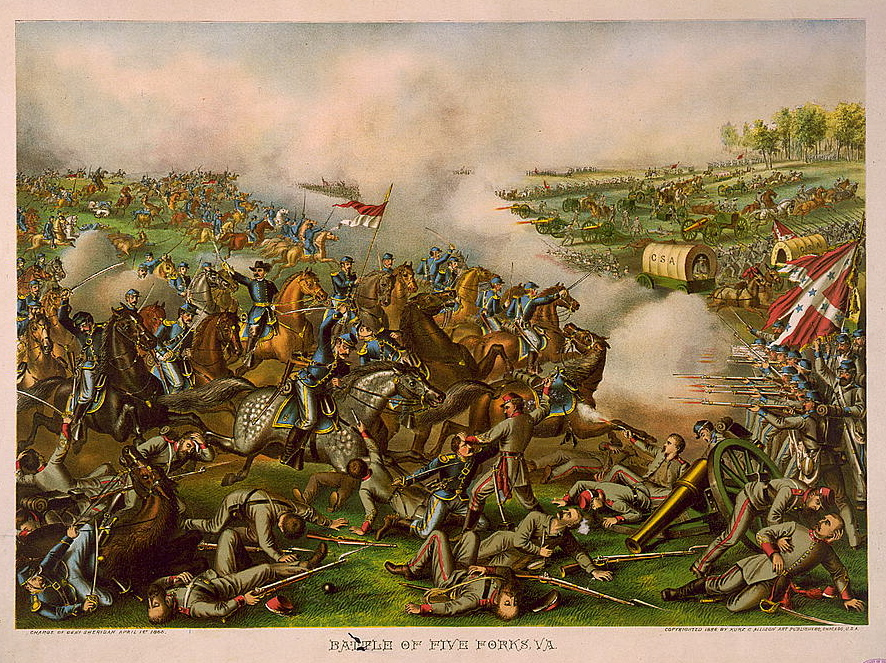
- Battle of Five Forks

- Location within Virginia Location within the United States
- Location: Five Forks, Dinwiddie County, Virginia, USA
- Nearest city: Petersburg, Virginia
- Coordinates: 37°8′29″N 77°36′48″W
- Area: 1,215 acres (4.92 km^{2})
- NRHP reference No.: 66000830

Significant dates
- Added to NRHP: October 15, 1966
- Designated NHL: December 19, 1960

Five Forks Battlefield is a battlefield of the American Civil War, the location of the Battle of Five Forks (April 1, 1865), in which Union Army forces broke through Confederate Army lines, opening the way to gain control of the last rail line to besieged Petersburg. The Confederate loss caused them to abandon that city, which undermined the defense of Richmond, the Confederate capital. Final surrender of the Confederate forces would occur at Appomattox Courthouse eight days later.

Part of the battlefield site is a unit of Petersburg National Battlefield, with public access that includes access trails to points of interest in the area. An area of more than 1,200 acres (490 ha) around Five Forks was declared a National Historic Landmark in 1960. The Civil War Trust (a division of the American Battlefield Trust) and its partners have acquired and preserved 419 acres (1.70 km^{2}) of the battlefield.

== Battle ==
General Robert E. Lee had ordered George Pickett's infantry and several units of cavalry to hold Five Forks at all costs. In the battle on April 1, 1865, Union troops under Gouverneur K. Warren broke through Pickett's lines, while Philip H. Sheridan personally led the cavalry charge, all of which overwhelmed the Confederate forces.

The battlefield area covers nearly all the area of fighting, and it includes a home named "Burnt Quarter". It includes the location of a shad bake (a fish feast), where General Pickett, unaware of the battle going on, was entertained. It is reported that unusual cloud conditions prevented the sound of artillery from carrying as far as it usually would.

== See also ==
- List of National Historic Landmarks in Virginia
- National Register of Historic Places listings in Dinwiddie County, Virginia
