= Knox Thompson =

American politician

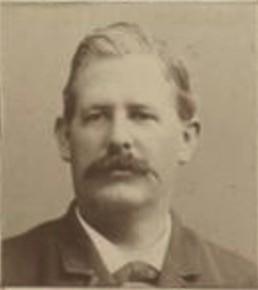

Member of the Virginia House of Delegates from Dinwiddie County
- In office December 2, 1891 – March 19, 1894
- Preceded by: L. E. Coleman
- Succeeded by: Samuel Y. Gilliam

Personal details
- Born: January 25, 1848 Dinwiddie, Virginia, U.S.
- Died: March 19, 1894 (aged 46) Dinwiddie, Virginia, U.S.
- Party: Democratic
- Spouse: Lou Gee
- Education: Virginia Military Institute

Military service
- Allegiance: Confederate States
- Branch/service: Confederate States Army
- Battles/wars: American Civil War

Knox Thompson (January 25, 1848 – March 19, 1894) was an American politician who served in the Virginia House of Delegates.
