= Pamplin Historical Park =

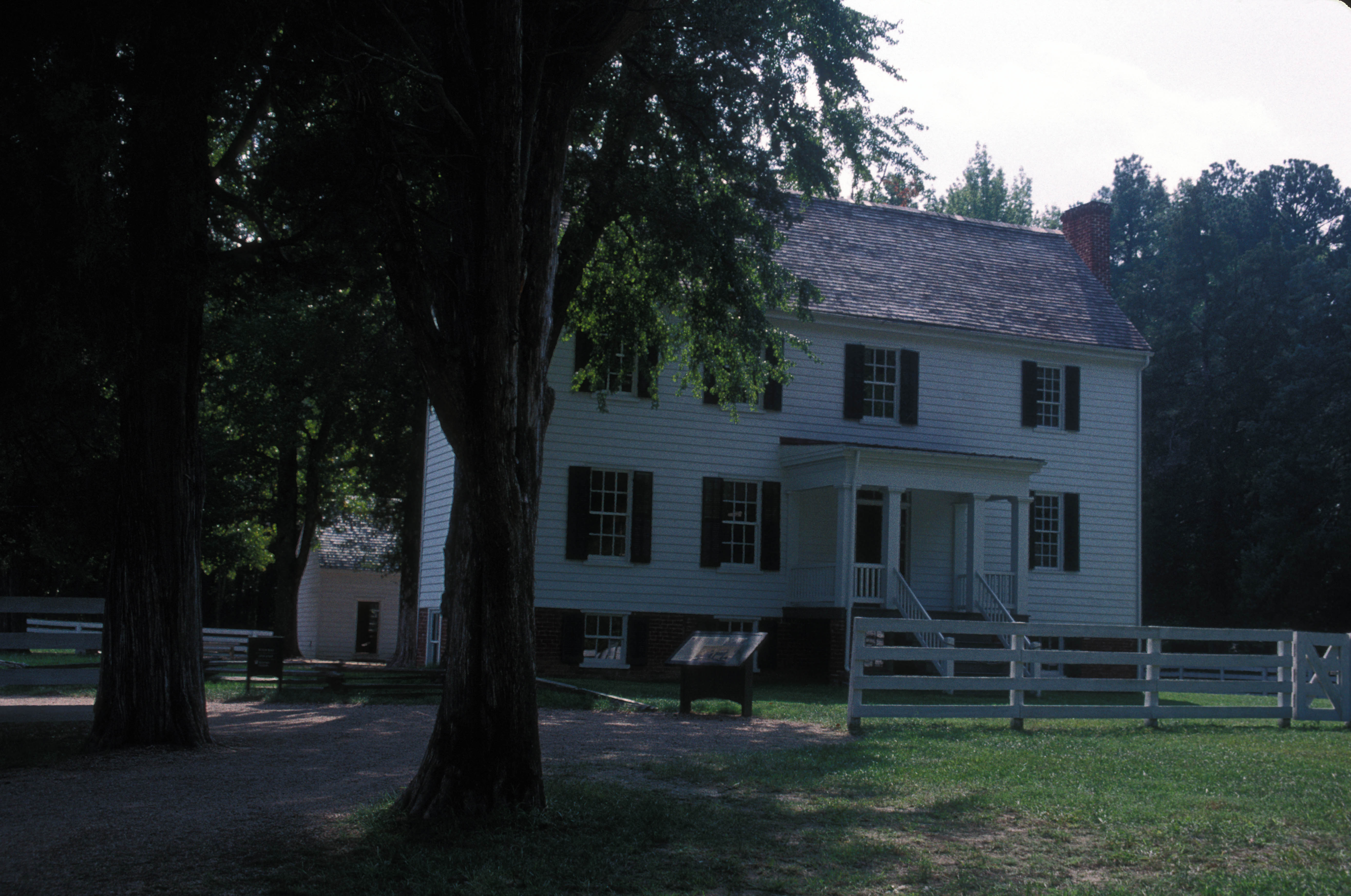
- Historic Tudor Hall Plantation

- Location within Virginia Location within the United States
- Location: Dinwiddie, VA
- Nearest city: Petersburg, Virginia
- Coordinates: 37.1829°N 77.4794°W
- Area: 424 acres (172 ha)
- Established: 1991
- Website: www.pamplinpark.org

Pamplin Historical Park is a 424-acre private sector historical park located near Petersburg, Virginia. The park preserves open space near Richmond, Virginia in Dinwiddie County, Virginia and serves the dual use of preserving a significant fragment of the Petersburg Breakthrough Battlefield, a National Historic Landmark, and key components of the Third Battle of Petersburg. The park also provides a footprint location for the National Museum of the Civil War Soldier, which is located within the park.

The Pamplin Historical Park cooperates with owners of adjacent parcels of Third Battle of Petersburg property, the Petersburg National Battlefield and the American Battlefield Trust, in preserving much (not all) of the physical space on which the battle was fought and interpreting it for the general public. In particular, a decisive segment of the battle, the Boydton Plank Road breakthrough by the 5th Vermont Infantry and other units, occurred on Pamplin Park property at dawn on April 2, 1865.

The park includes several pre-Civil War structures that are interpreted to 1864-1865 and presented as an integral part of the park landscape, including Tudor Hall Plantation (c. 1812). 3 miles (4.8 km) of park trails include close-up looks at the Confederate trenches that were the target of the climactic Federal assault. The park bears the name of its founder, businessman and Civil War enthusiast Robert B. Pamplin, Jr.

A. Wilson Greene helped develop Pamplin Historical Park and served as its executive director from 1994 to 2017. It is a Virginia Historic Landmark, was designated a U.S. National Historic Landmark, and is listed on the National Register of Historic Places.
