= A. Wilson Greene =

American historian (born 1949)

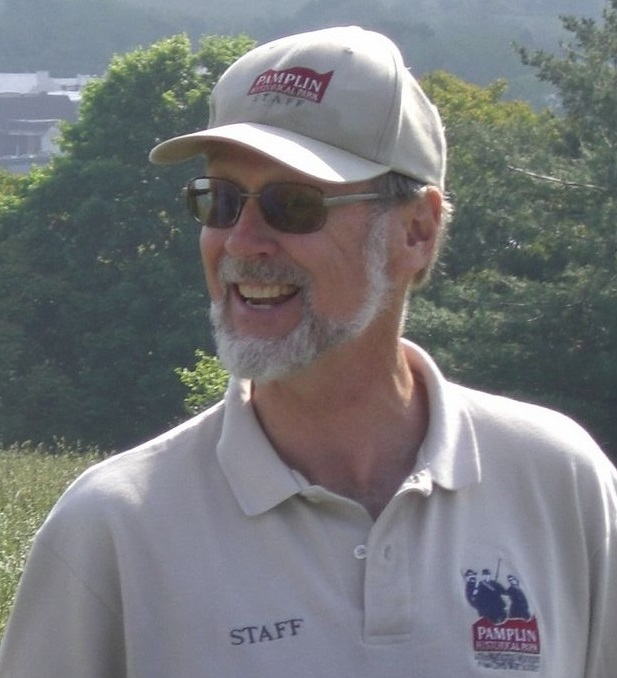
- Civil War historian A. Wilson Greene in 2008
- Born: December 18, 1949 (age 76); Chicago, Illinois
- Education: Florida State University (BA); Louisiana State University (MA)
- Occupations: Museum director and author
- Writing career
- Genre: History
- Subject: American Civil War
- Notable work: Civil War Petersburg: Confederate City in the Crucible of War
- Notable awards: Laney Book Prize (2007); Nevins-Freeman Award (2011)

Allen Wilson Greene (born December 18, 1949), also known as Will Greene, is an American historian, author, and retired museum director. Greene was the director of the Association for the Preservation of Civil War Sites. Later, he became director of Pamplin Historical Park and the National Museum of the Civil War Soldier in Petersburg, Virginia. He also served on the national oversight board for the Institute of Museum and Library Services Over the years, Greene has made ten appearances on C-SPAN.

== Early life and education ==
Greene was born on the south side of Chicago, Illinois on December 18, 1949. He grew up in Wheaton, a city located 26 miles west of Chicago. In 1963, Greene's parents took him to visit the Civil War battlefield at Gettysburg, Pennsylvania. That was the beginning of his lifelong interest in American Civil War history.

Greene attended Florida State University where he graduated in 1972 with a Bachelor of Arts degree in American history. He went on to graduate school at Louisiana State University. At Louisiana State, he studied under the well-known American historian, T. Harry Williams. Greene received a Master of Arts in history from Louisiana State in 1977.

== Civil war historian ==
After college, Greene went to work for the National Park Service as a historian and park ranger. During his time with the Park Service, Greene was assigned to a number of national historic park sites including Independence National Historical Park, Gulf Islands National Seashore, Chalmette National Historical Park, Petersburg National Battlefield, and Fredericksburg and Spotsylvania National Military Park.

In 1989, Greene began leading civil war history tours for the Smithsonian Institution. Over the years, he has become a frequent lecturer and tour leader for the Smithsonian, the Blue and Gray Education Society, and other groups. As of 2018, he was still leading Smithsonian tours.

He left the National Park Service in 1990 to become the first director of the newly formed Association for the Preservation of Civil War Sites (now called the Civil War Preservation Trust). Because he was a well-known Civil War historian, Greene was selected as a script reviewer for the 1993 feature film Gettysburg. A decade later, Greene was a historical adviser for the sequel film, Gods and Generals.

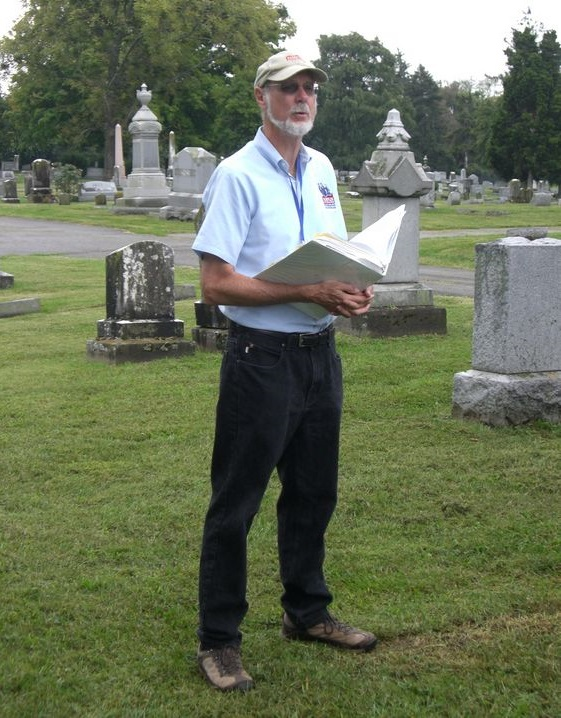
Greene leading a Civil War tour, 2012

In 1995, Greene became the first executive director of the Pamplin Historical Park. He also became the first director of the National Museum of the Civil War Soldier, when the museum opened in 1999. From that time on, he directed both institutions concurrently. The park and museum are both located in Dinwiddie County, Virginia. The park covers 424-acre (172 ha) and was listed as a National Historic Landmark in 2006. Greene remained the director of these two related institutions until he retired in 2017.

In 2005, President George W. Bush appointed Greene to the oversight board for the Institute of Museum and Library Services. The board oversees the federal agency that advises and supports museums and libraries throughout the United States. Greene served two four-year terms on the board.

Greene received the 2011 Nevins-Freeman Award from the Chicago Civil War Round Table. The Nevins-Freeman Award was established in 1974 to recognize special individuals for their outstanding American Civil War scholarship. The award includes a substantial financial contribution to a historical preservation project selected by the recipient.

As a well-known historian, Greene has been invited to lecture and participate in panel discussions on the C-SPAN television network. As of 2018, Greene has made ten appearances on C-SPAN. His first appearance was in 2011. His most recent C-SPAN engagement was in 2018. On C-SPAN, Greene has lectured on American Civil War campaigns and battles as well as individual military leaders who served in that conflict. In addition, Greene has hosted C-SPAN lectures and panel discussions covering various Civil War topics.

== Author ==
Over the years, Greene has written a number books along with over 20 journal articles on American Civil War subjects. He has published articles in other media as well. For example, he contributed an article on the Petersburg battle campaign to the on-line Encyclopedia Virginia in 2009. In 2014, Greene began writing a weekly column for the Petersburg Progress-Index newspaper. His column celebrated the sesquicentennial of the American Civil War and highlighted the military actions that took place during the siege of Petersburg in 1864.

Greene's books have been published by a wide range of government, private, and academic institutions. His first book, National Geographic Guide to Civil War National Battlefield Parks (ISBN 9780870448782), was published by the National Geographic Society in 1992. It was co-written with Gary W. Gallagher. Later that year, Greene's book Whatever You Resolve to Be: Essays on Stonewall Jackson (ISBN 9781572334304) was published by University of Tennessee Press. An updated version of the book was published in 2005. His book, The Second Battle of Manassas (ISBN 9780915992850), was published by the Eastern National Park and Monument Association in 1995. In 1999, Fredericksburg Battlefields: Fredericksburg and Spotsylvania County Battlefields Memorial National Military Park, Virginia (ISBN 9780912627670) was published by the United States Department of Interior. A year later, Da Capo Press published Greene's book Breaking the Backbone of the Rebellion: The Final Days of the Petersburg Campaign (ISBN 9781882810482). Then, Pamplin Historical Park and the National Museum of the Civil War Soldier: A Visitor's Guide (ISBN 9781578643592) was published by Donning Company Publishers in 2006.

Greene's book, Civil War Petersburg: Confederate City in the Crucible of War (ISBN 9781572336100), was published by the University Tennessee Press in 2008. Later that year, Greene received the Daniel M. and Marilyn W. Laney Book Prize for his Petersburg book. The Laney book award recognizes distinguished scholarship and writing on military or political aspects of the American Civil War.

Greene began research for a three-volume history of the Petersburg campaign in 2007. Those books are under contract to be published by the University of North Carolina Press as part of their American Civil War series. Greene's three volume series is titled A Campaign of Giants—The Battle for Petersburg. The first volume, subtitled From the Crossing of the James to the Crater (ISBN 978-1469638577), was published in 2018.

== Personal life and legacy ==
Today, Greene lives with his wife, Maggie, in Walden, Tennessee. From there, he continues his research and writing on the American Civil War. He also continues to lead Civil War battlefield tours and lectures on Civil War topic across the county. In the meantime, Greene enjoys hiking, travel, and golf. He is also a fan of basketball and hockey. Greene is dedicated enough to hockey that he served as an official in the Southern Professional Hockey League for three years.

The A. Wilson Greene Scholarship Fund is an educational program that helps schools and other groups have access to Civil War battlefields and historical parks. The fund works with Robert B. Pamplin Jr., a philanthropist and historical preservation activist.
