= Virginia Historic Landmark =

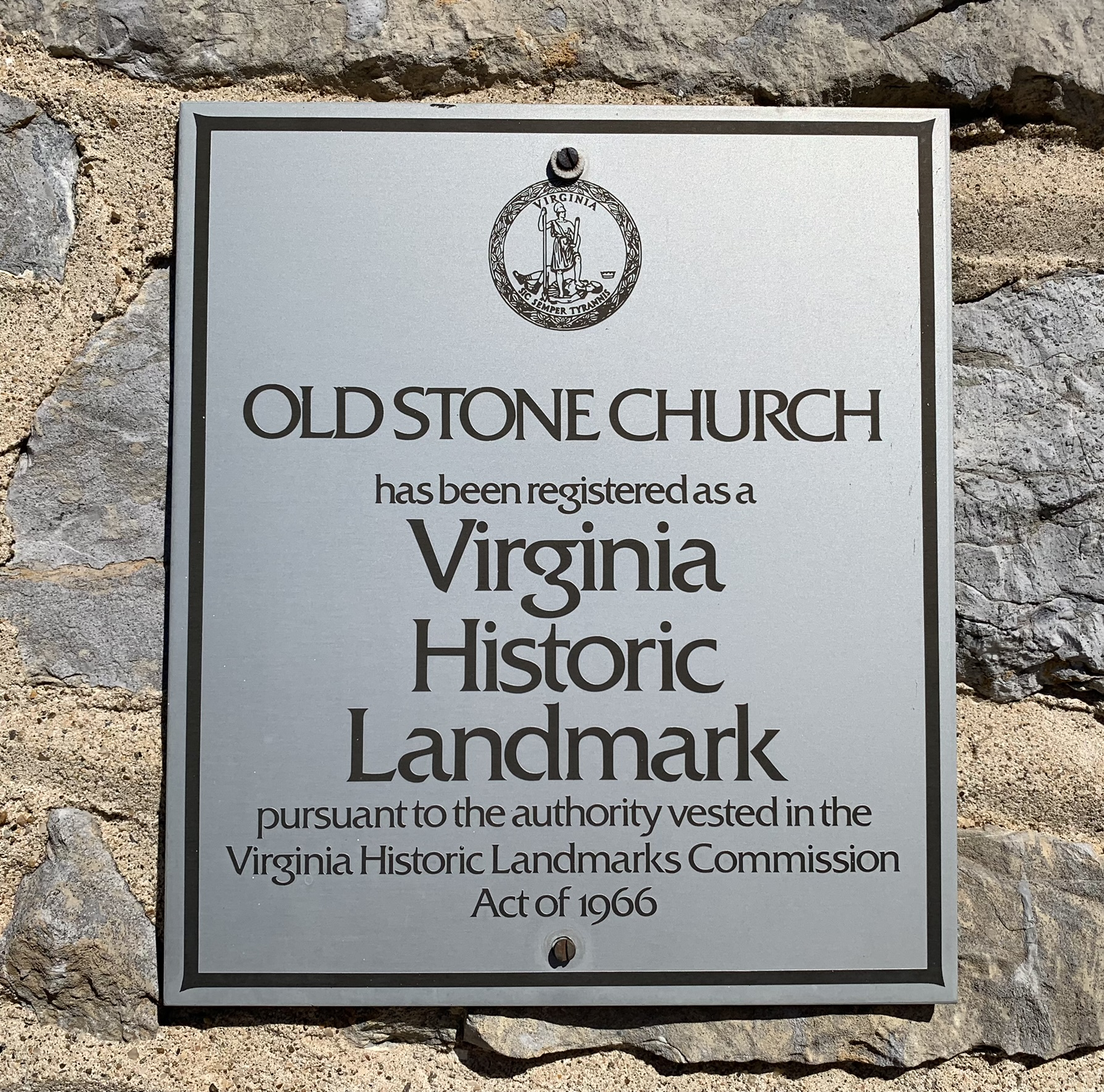
Plaque on the Old Stone Church in Winchester, Virginia

A Virginia Historic Landmark is a structure, site, or place designated as a landmark by the Virginia Department of Historic Resources.

== Inclusion process ==
Nominations for the Virginia Landmark Register are simultaneously processed for inclusion on the National Register for Historic Places. Both registries were formed in 1966.

There are two parts to the selection process for designating landmarks:

1. evaluation and nomination with the latter contingent on passing the evaluation stage.
2. upon accepting the nomination for the state level landmark status, the State Review Board makes a recommendation on whether the State Historic Preservation Officer should submit it to the Keeper of the National Register of Historic Places in Washington, D.C.

== Historic sites ==
The following is a partial list of the sites designated as Virginia Historic Landmarks, on the Virginia Landmarks Register:

- Ball-Sellers House
- Fairfield Plantation
- Monterey Hotel
- Michie Tavern
- Natural Bridge
- Pamplin Historical Park and National Museum of the Civil War Soldier
- Ramsay
- Seay's Chapel Methodist Church
- Sherwood Forest Plantation

== See also ==
- Virginia Landmarks Register
- List of National Historic Landmarks in Virginia
- National Register of Historic Places listings in Virginia
