= Butterwood Methodist Church and Butterwood Cemetery =

Historic church in Virginia, United States

- U.S. National Register of Historic Places
- Virginia Landmarks Register
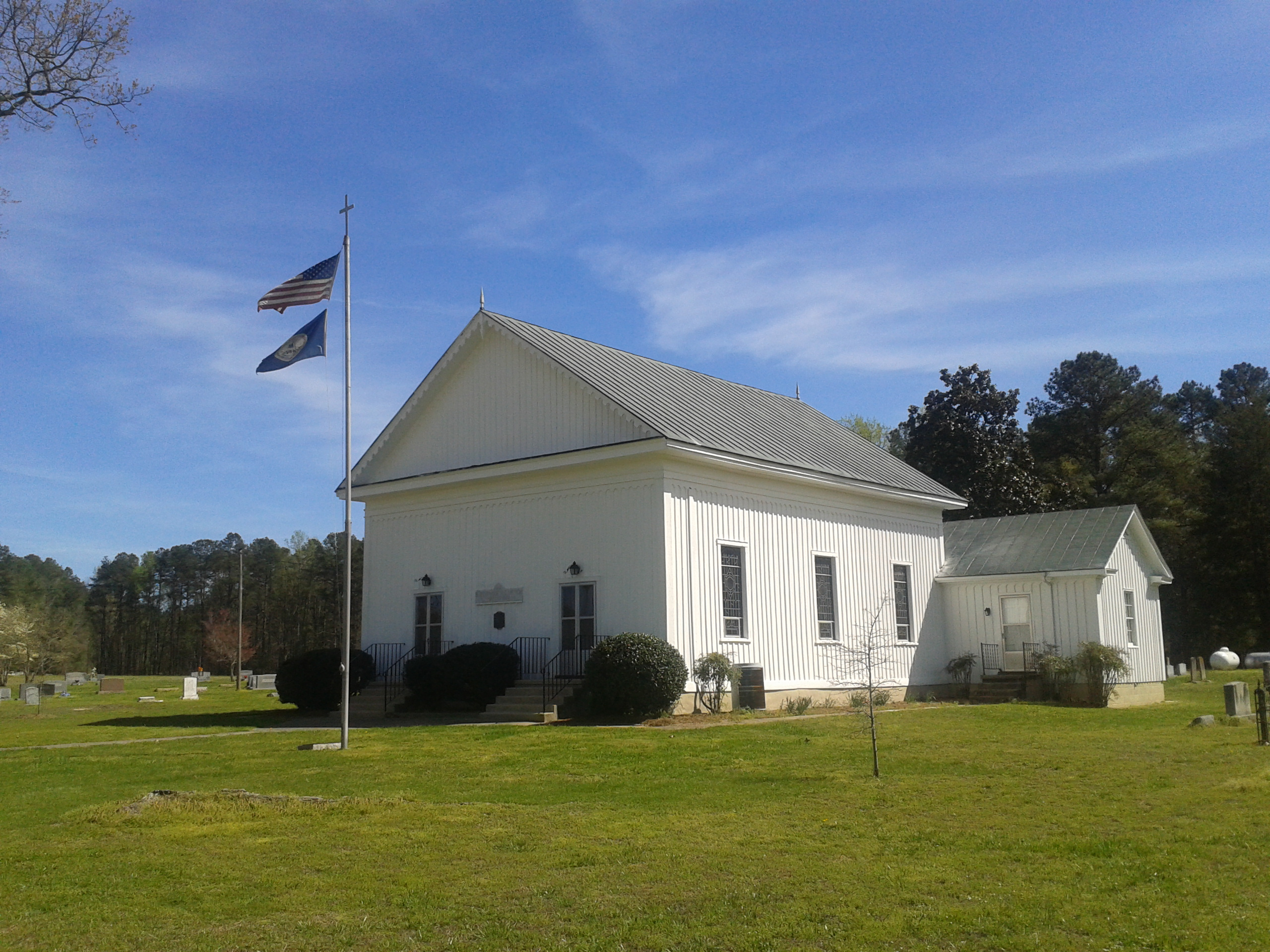
- View of the church in April 2017

- Location within Virginia Location within the United States
- Location: VA 40, Darvills, Virginia
- Coordinates: 37°4′21″N 77°51′41″W
- Area: 9.8 acres (4.0 ha)
- Built: 1866
- Architect: Atkinson, William Randolph
- Architectural style: Gothic Revival
- NRHP reference No.: 03000213
- VLR No.: 026-0111

Significant dates
- Added to NRHP: April 11, 2003
- Designated VLR: December 4, 2002

Butterwood Methodist Church and Butterwood Cemetery is a historic Methodist church and cemetery located near Darvills, Dinwiddie County, Virginia. It was built in 1866–1867, and is a one-story, frame building in the Carpenter Gothic style. It measures approximately 34 feet wide and 45 feet long, and features board and batten siding and concave gingerbread trim. Surrounding the church are approximately nine additional acres to which about 1,000 graves were moved from cemeteries that had to be abandoned when the 48,000-acre Camp Pickett Military Reservation was created at the beginning of World War II.

It was listed on the National Register of Historic Places in 2003.
