= Conover Archaeological Site =

Archaeological site in Virginia, United States

- U.S. National Register of Historic Places
- Nearest city: Carson, Virginia
- Area: 6 acres (2.4 ha)
- NRHP reference No.: 85000647
- Added to NRHP: March 28, 1985

The Conover Archaeological Site is a prehistoric Native American site located in Dinwiddie County, Virginia, near the community of Carson. It is one of the few sites in Virginia which is documented to date to c. 9500 BCE. The large number of stone artifacts found at this site, including tools for working stone and stone tool manufacturing byproducts, suggest this site was used as a quarry or maintenance site by paleo-Indians.

The site was listed on the National Register of Historic Places in 1985.

== See also ==
- Nottoway Archeological Site
- National Register of Historic Places listings in Dinwiddie County, Virginia
