= Sallie Jones Atkinson =

American educator

Sarah Green Jones Atkinson (October 14, 1860 – November 14, 1943) was an American educator based in rural Virginia.

== Early life ==
Born Sarah Green Jones, she was a native of Dinwiddie County, Virginia, and born into a family of educators.

== Career ==
Atkinson and her husband donated land and timber in 1911 to construct the first high school in Dinwiddie County in 1911. She also supported teaching at the school. Sunnyside High School became the first eight-month rural school to gain accreditation in Virginia. Students had that schedule because they were needed during the other months to work on family farms.

Atkinson was also known for her support of the local 4-H Club and its students, which provided education and training for young people in livestock and crop management, cooking and baking skills, and other needed activities. Atkinson also worked for women's suffrage in Virginia, serving on a state committee under Governor Andrew Jackson Montague. The committee convinced him to support women having the right to vote.

== Honors ==
Atkinson was honored in 1986 by a historical marker erected by the Virginia Department of Conservation and Historic Resources. It is located in Dinwiddie County, near the town of McKenney.

== Personal life ==
She married John Pryor Atkinson. Atkinson died in Dinwiddie County. She was interred in the graveyard of Concord Presbyterian Church in Rawlings, in neighboring Brunswick County. Her name on the marker is given as "Sally", a common informal version of Sarah.
