= Sappony Church =

Historic church in Virginia, United States

- U.S. National Register of Historic Places
- Virginia Landmarks Register
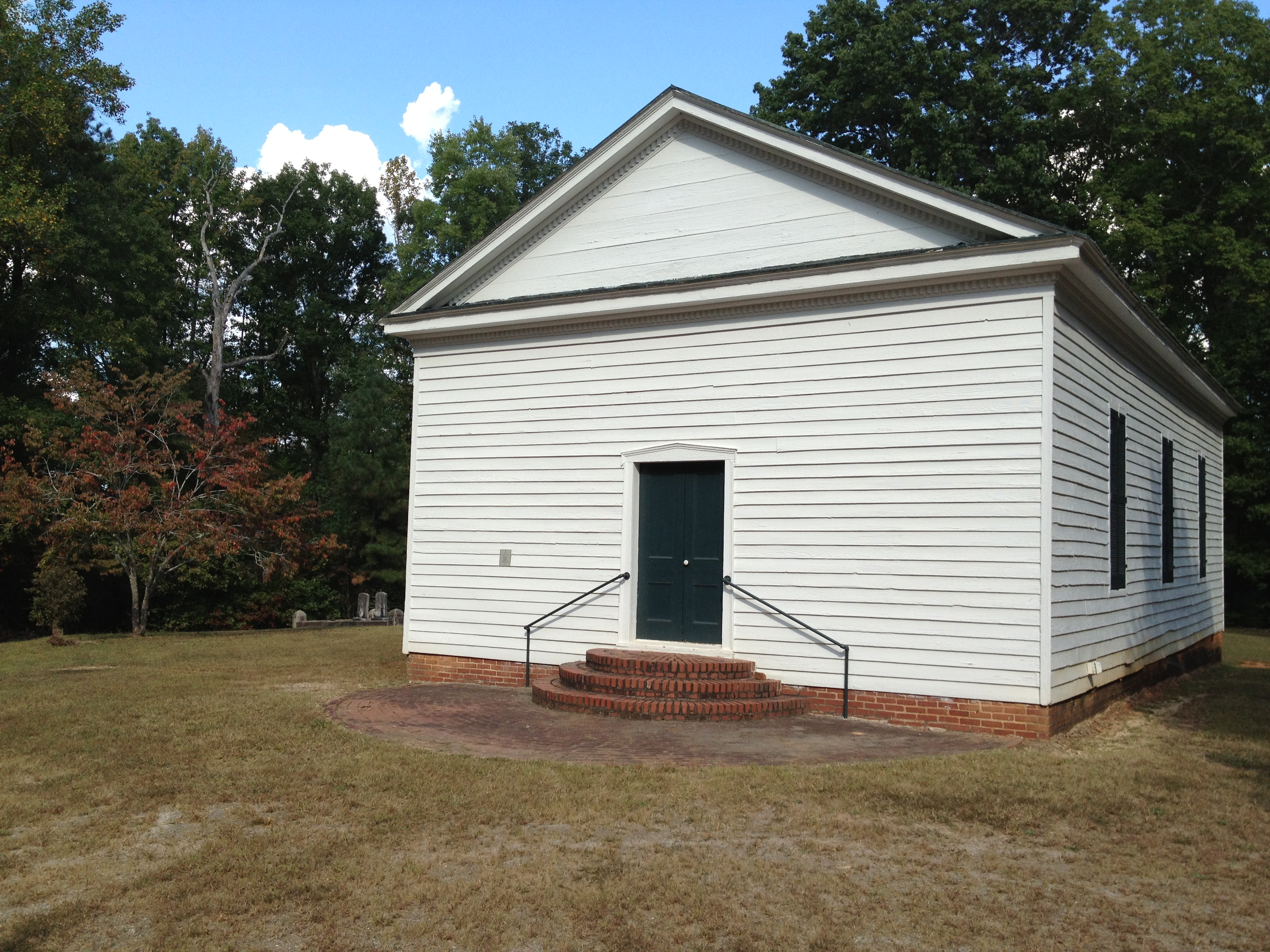

- Location within Virginia Location within the United States
- Location: S of Sappony Creek off VA 692, McKenney, Virginia
- Coordinates: 36°58′14″N 77°38′10″W
- Area: 4 acres (1.6 ha)
- Built: 1725-1726
- NRHP reference No.: 76002101
- VLR No.: 026-0019

Significant dates
- Added to NRHP: April 30, 1976
- Designated VLR: October 21, 1975

Sappony Church, also known as Sapony Church and Sappony Episcopal Church, is a historic Episcopal church located at McKenney, Dinwiddie County, Virginia. It was built in 1725–1726, and is a one-story, three bay long, rectangular frame building with a low gable roof. A vestry room was added early in the 19th century; the building was remodeled in the mid-19th century and again in 1870.

It was listed on the National Register of Historic Places in 1976.
