= Petersburg Breakthrough Battlefield =

- U.S. National Register of Historic Places
- U.S. National Historic Landmark District
- Virginia Landmarks Register
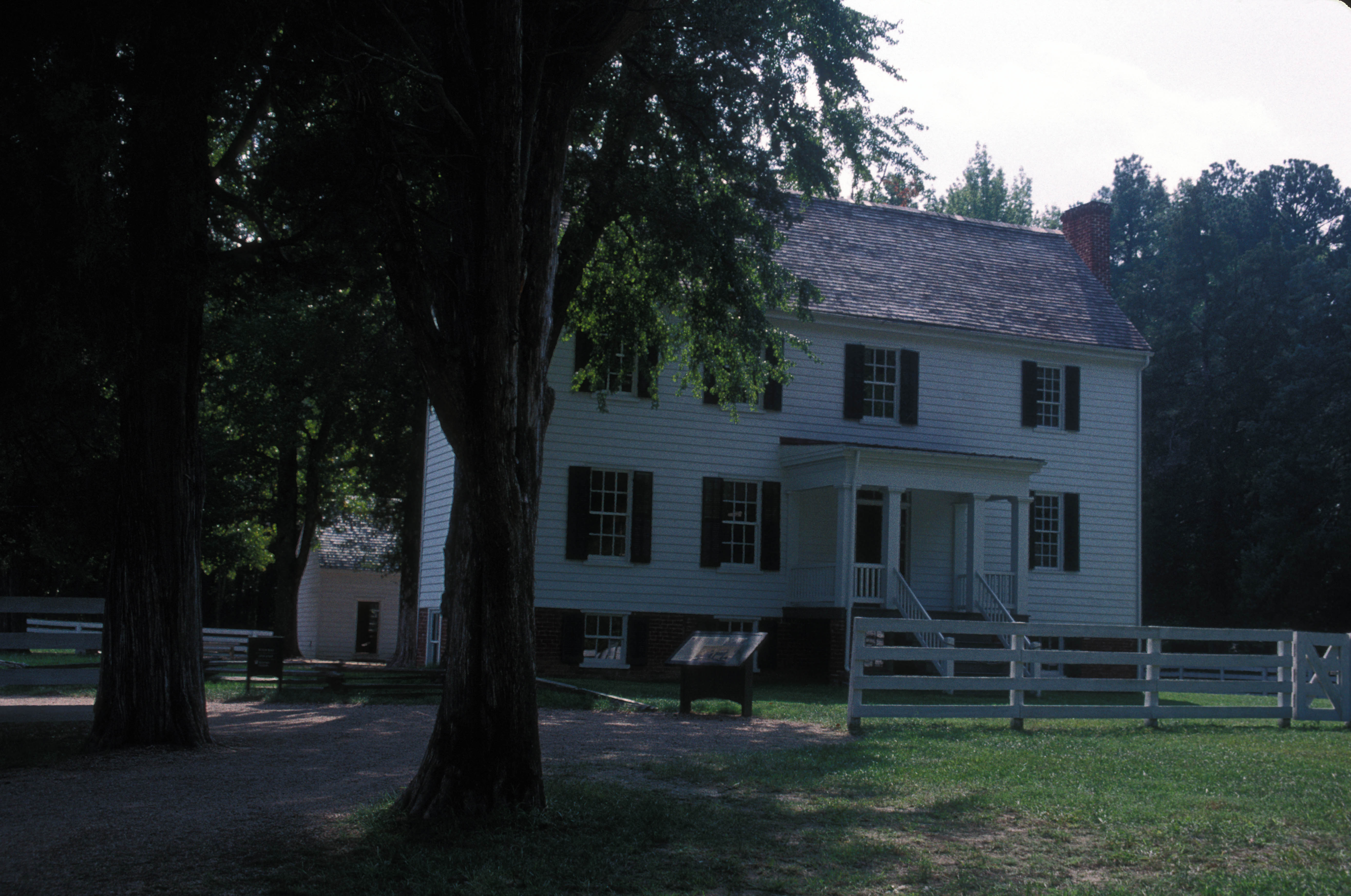
- Tudor Hall

- Location within Virginia Location within the United States
- Location: Jct. of Duncan and Boydton Plank Rds., Petersburg, Virginia
- Coordinates: 37°11′22″N 77°28′33″W
- NRHP reference No.: 06000239
- VLR No.: 026-5013

Significant dates
- Added to NRHP: February 17, 2006
- Designated VLR: June 18, 2003

- Petersburg Breakthrough Battlefield Historic District at Pamplin Historical Park
- U.S. National Register of Historic Places
- U.S. Historic district
- Location within Virginia Location within the United States
- Location: 6125 Boydton Plank Rd., 6619 Duncan Rd., Petersburg, Virginia
- Built: 1864
- Architect: C.S. Army
- Architectural style: Greek Revival, Gothic Revival
- NRHP reference No.: 03001095

Significant dates
- Added to NRHP: October 22, 2003
- Designated HD: February 17, 2006

The Petersburg Breakthrough Battlefield is a historic district in Dinwiddie County, near Petersburg, Virginia. It was the location of the Third Battle of Petersburg, in which the Union Army broke through Confederate Army lines protecting Petersburg and Richmond on April 2, 1865, during the American Civil War. The success of the breakthrough led to abandonment of Richmond by General Robert E. Lee, a general retreat, and surrender at Appomattox Court House one week later. Portions of the area were listed on the National Register of Historic Places in 2003, and a different portion (overlapping the first) was designated a National Historic Landmark in 2006. Much of the battlefield area is part of Pamplin Historical Park, a private park open to the public that interprets the battle. The park includes a full-service visitor center, trails, displays, interpretive signs and history programs. The Civil War Trust (a division of the American Battlefield Trust) and its partners have acquired and preserved 407 acres (1.65 km^{2}) of the Breakthrough battlefield in five transactions since 2004.

== Description ==
The Petersburg Breakthrough Battlefield is located just southwest of Petersburg. It is a large area, roughly bounded on the northwest by United States Route 1, to the north by the Rohoic Woods Apartment complex on Virginia State Route 670, the east by Hofheimer Way and Church Road (Virginia State Route 672), and on the south by Arthur Swamp, an area that drains south into the Nottoway River. The battlefield area is located on private land just west of the Fort Fisher and Fort Welch area of Petersburg National Battlefield, a U.S. National Park Service-administered area. Much of this area is part of Pamplin Historical Park, a private park which interprets the battle.

The preserved portions of the battlefield include nearly 1,700 feet (520 m) of Confederate earthworks, which are among the best-preserved known. Archaeological evidence of the Confederate camps, located at the back of those works, is also present, as are a series of rifle pits dug by the Confederates. Some of these were taken over by Union forces in the action. Also included in the defenses are two dams (of an unknown number that would have been built) for the diversion of water in and around the defenses. On the east side of Arthur Swamp the Confederates built a large redan on one of the area's natural high points.

The battlefield area also now includes recreations of Confederate log cabins, built as part of their winter quarters, and the facilities of Pamplin Historical Park. The park area includes the Hart House, built 1859-61, which has been restored to its appearance of that time, and the c. 1812 Tudor Hall, a Federal period house that stood just outside the area where the battle took place.

The battlefield is the subject of two separate, overlapping designations. In 2003 "Petersburg Breakthrough Battlefield Historic District at Pamplin Historical Park" was listed on the National Register of Historic Places, encompasses about 422 acres (171 ha), including all of Pamplin Historical Park and three adjacent residential properties. In 2006 an area of just over 647 acres (262 ha) was designated a National Historic Landmark. The latter designation includes larger areas of properties adjacent to Pamplin Park, and excludes portions of the park (such as Tudor Hall) that did not directly bear on the battle.

== See also ==
- List of National Historic Landmarks in Virginia
- National Register of Historic Places listings in Dinwiddie County, Virginia
