= Zehmer Farm =

Historic house in Virginia, United States

- U.S. National Register of Historic Places
- Virginia Landmarks Register
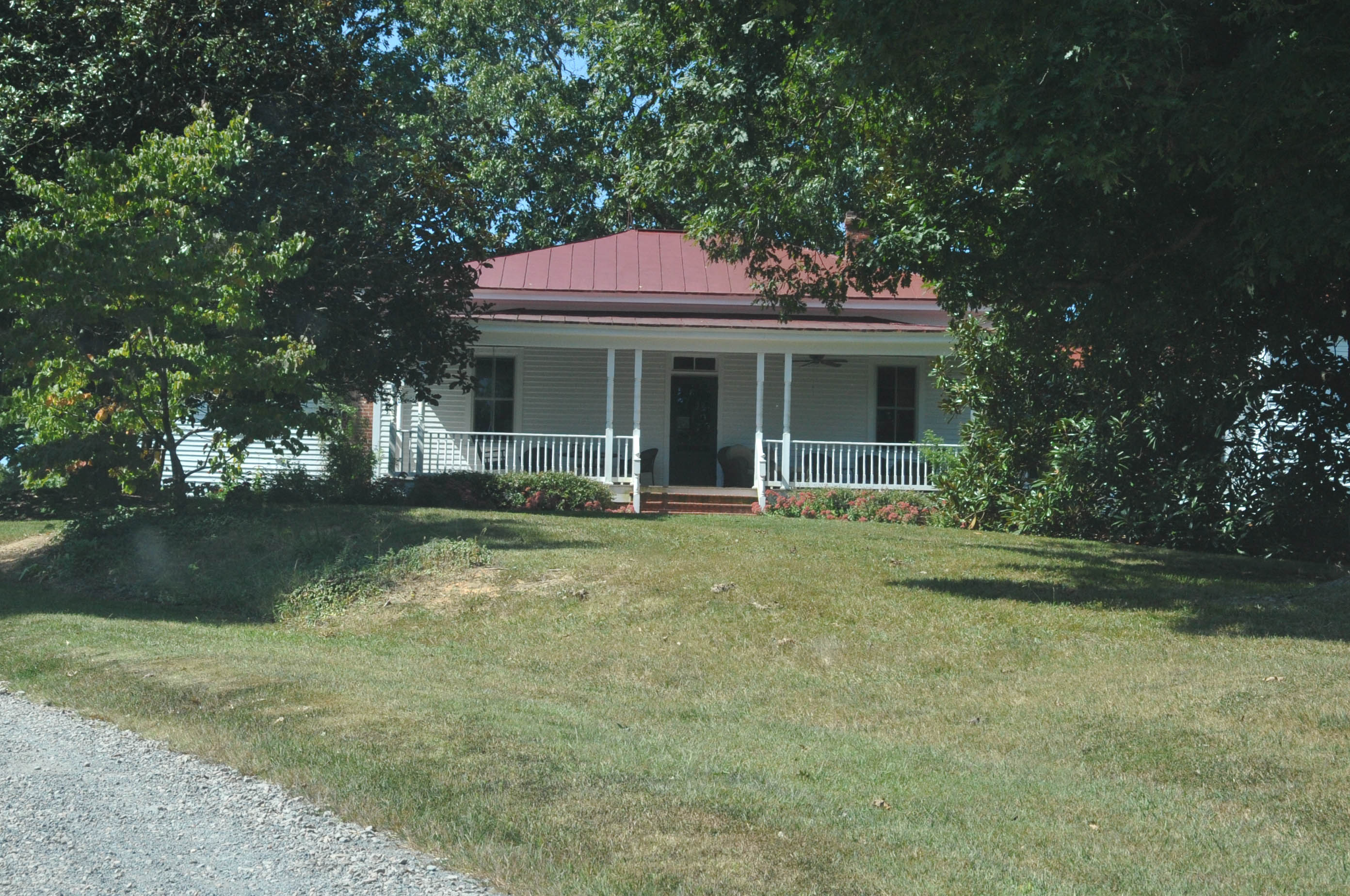

- Location within Virginia Location within the United States
- Location: 9818 Jack Zehmer Rd., McKenney, Virginia
- Coordinates: 36°59′04″N 77°43′44″W
- Area: 309 acres (125 ha)
- Built: 1905
- Architectural style: Late 19th And 20th Century Revivals
- NRHP reference No.: 09000793
- VLR No.: 257-5008

Significant dates
- Added to NRHP: September 30, 2009
- Designated VLR: June 18, 2009

Zehmer Farm is a historic home and farm complex located near McKenney, Dinwiddie County, Virginia. The farmhouse was built about 1905, and is a one-story, frame L-shaped dwelling with a broad hipped roof and wings added to both sides. Also on the property are a collection of outbuildings and farm structures – including animal shelters, corn crib, flue-cured tobacco barns, dairy barn and milk houses, and the sites of tenant houses, a butcher house, fire-cured tobacco barns and a sawmill.

It was listed on the National Register of Historic Places in 2009.
