= Central State Hospital Chapel =

Historic chapel in Virginia, US

- Formerly listed on the U.S. National Register of Historic Places
- Virginia Landmarks Register
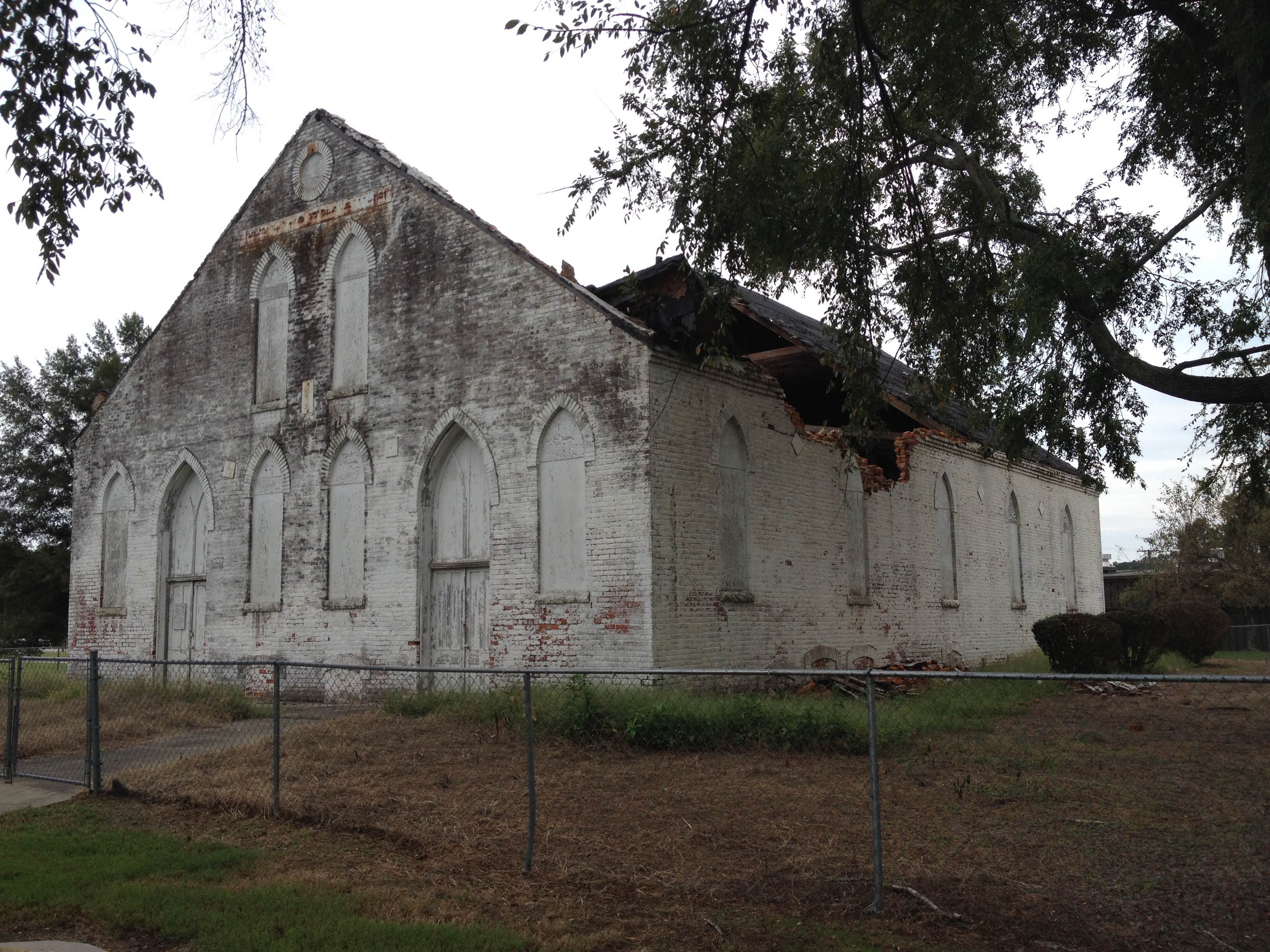

- Location within Virginia Location within the United States
- Location: West Washington Street Extended, near Petersburg, Virginia
- Coordinates: 37°12′28″N 77°27′10″W
- Area: Less than one acre
- Built: 1904
- Architectural style: Gothic Revival
- NRHP reference No.: 10000794
- VLR No.: 026-0123-0005

Significant dates
- Added to NRHP: September 24, 2010
- Designated VLR: June 17, 2010
- Removed from NRHP: February 7, 2017

Central State Hospital Chapel is a historic chapel located on the grounds of Central State Hospital near Petersburg, Dinwiddie County, Virginia. It was built in 1904, and is a simple, 1 1/2-story brick structure measuring 80 by 50 feet, with a front gable roof and Late Gothic Revival details. The building features lancet window openings.

It was listed on the National Register of Historic Places in 2010, and was removed from the National Register in 2017.
