= Williamson Site =

Archaeological site in Virginia, United States

- U.S. National Register of Historic Places
- Virginia Landmarks Register
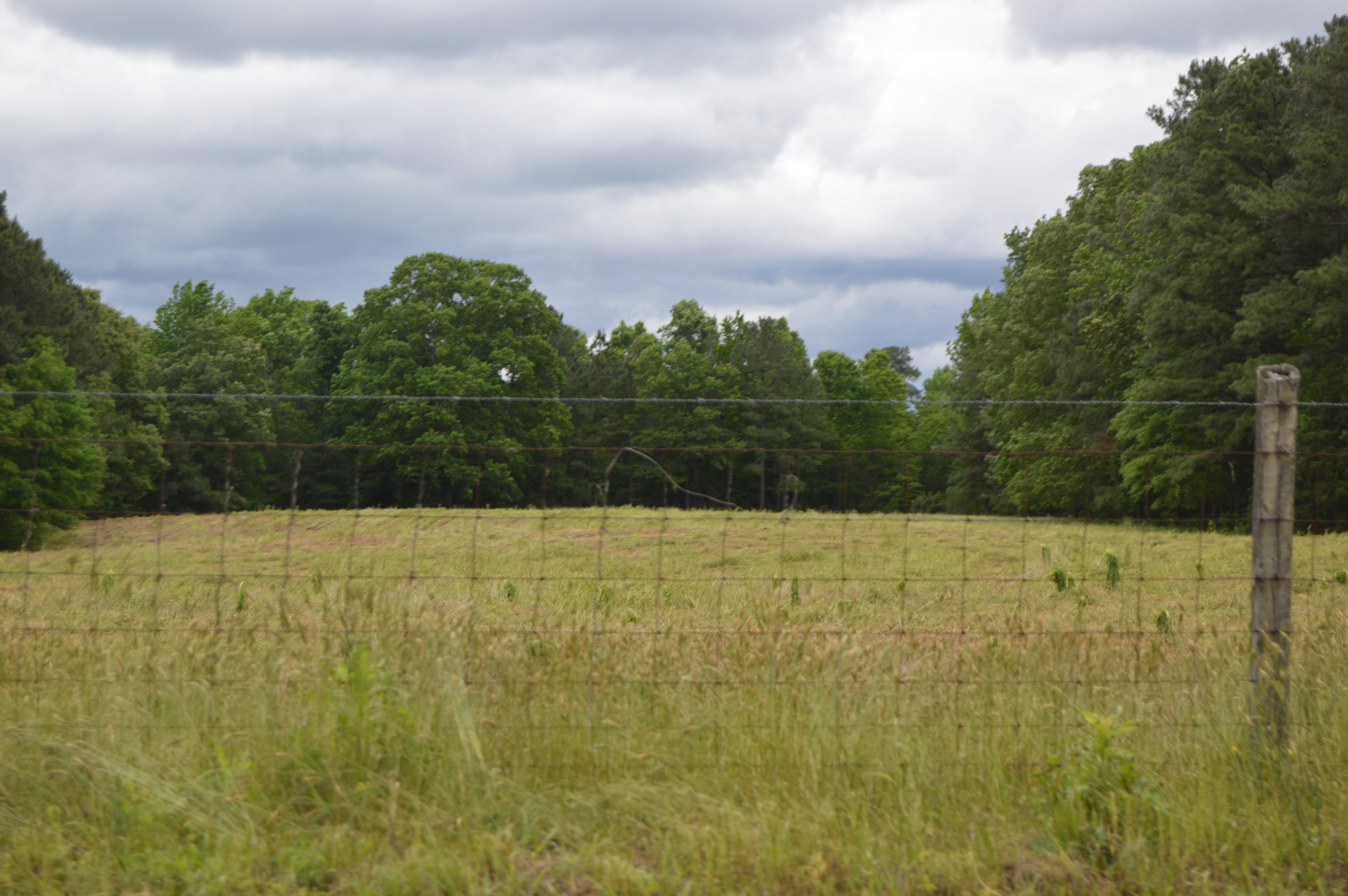
- Overview from the south
- Nearest city: Dinwiddie, Virginia
- Area: 20 acres (8.1 ha)
- NRHP reference No.: 69000237
- VLR No.: 026-0035

Significant dates
- Added to NRHP: December 3, 1969
- Designated VLR: May 13, 1969

The Williamson Site is an early prehistoric archaeological site located about 5 miles East of Dinwiddie, Dinwiddie County, Virginia along the south bank of the Little Cattail Creek. It is one of the largest Early Man sites in North America and dated to sometime between 15,000 and 11,500 years Before Present. It was listed on the National Register of Historic Places in 1969.

== Archaeology ==
The site was first identified in 1947 after 4 fluted points were found there and it was noted that the surface was covered with cores and unused flakes. Thirty three Paleo-Indian fluted points and a number of snub-nosed scrapers, side scrapers, fluted basal ends of knives, and gravers were subsequently recovered, primarily of chert. A large number of projectile points from later period, mostly made of quartzite, were found as well. It consists of more than 75 acres of cultivated land. The site consists of over 100 areas where projectile points have been found.

In 1965 Ben McCary and Vance Haynes made two bulldozer cuts to test for possible stratigraphy. One cut showed possible stratigraphy. In March 1972 another excavation occurred. After cleaning the earlier bulldozer cut to establish strata, two 10 by 10 foot squares were excavated. Finds included a small crude fluted quartzite projectile point, a chert flake, two scrapers, and a hammerstone.

From 1992 to 1994 the site was excavated by Phillip J. Hill. Thirteen 5-foot squares were opened and a variety of flakes and tool debris were found.
