= DeWitt, Virginia =

Unincorporated community in Virginia, United States

- Unincorporated community
- Location within Virginia Location within the United States
- Coordinates: 37°02′20″N 77°38′36″W
- Country: United States
- State: Virginia
- County: Dinwiddie
- Elevation: 295 ft (90 m)
- Time zone: UTC-5 (Eastern (EST))
  - Summer (DST): UTC-4 (EDT)
- Area code: 804
- GNIS feature ID: 1465671

DeWitt is an unincorporated community in Dinwiddie County, Virginia, United States. DeWitt is located on U.S. Route 1, 6 miles (9.7 km) northeast of McKenney. It developed in a rural area of the county devoted to plantations worked by enslaved African Americans.

When completed in 1900, the Richmond, Petersburg and Carolina Railroad passed through DeWitt from Petersburg to Ridgeway Junction (today Norlina, North Carolina). At that time, it was merged into the Seaboard Air Line (SAL). By 1914, the population of DeWitt was estimated by the railroad to be about 200.

This line (dubbed the "S-line" after later mergers) continued to operate until the 1980s, but the CSX Norlina Subdivision abandoned this portion of the line, isolating DeWitt from former trade and traffic.

The Stony Creek Plantation in DeWitt, with its original building constructed in 1750, was listed on the National Register of Historic Places in 2003.
