= Montrose (McKenney, Virginia) =

Historic house in Virginia, United States

- U.S. National Register of Historic Places
- Virginia Landmarks Register
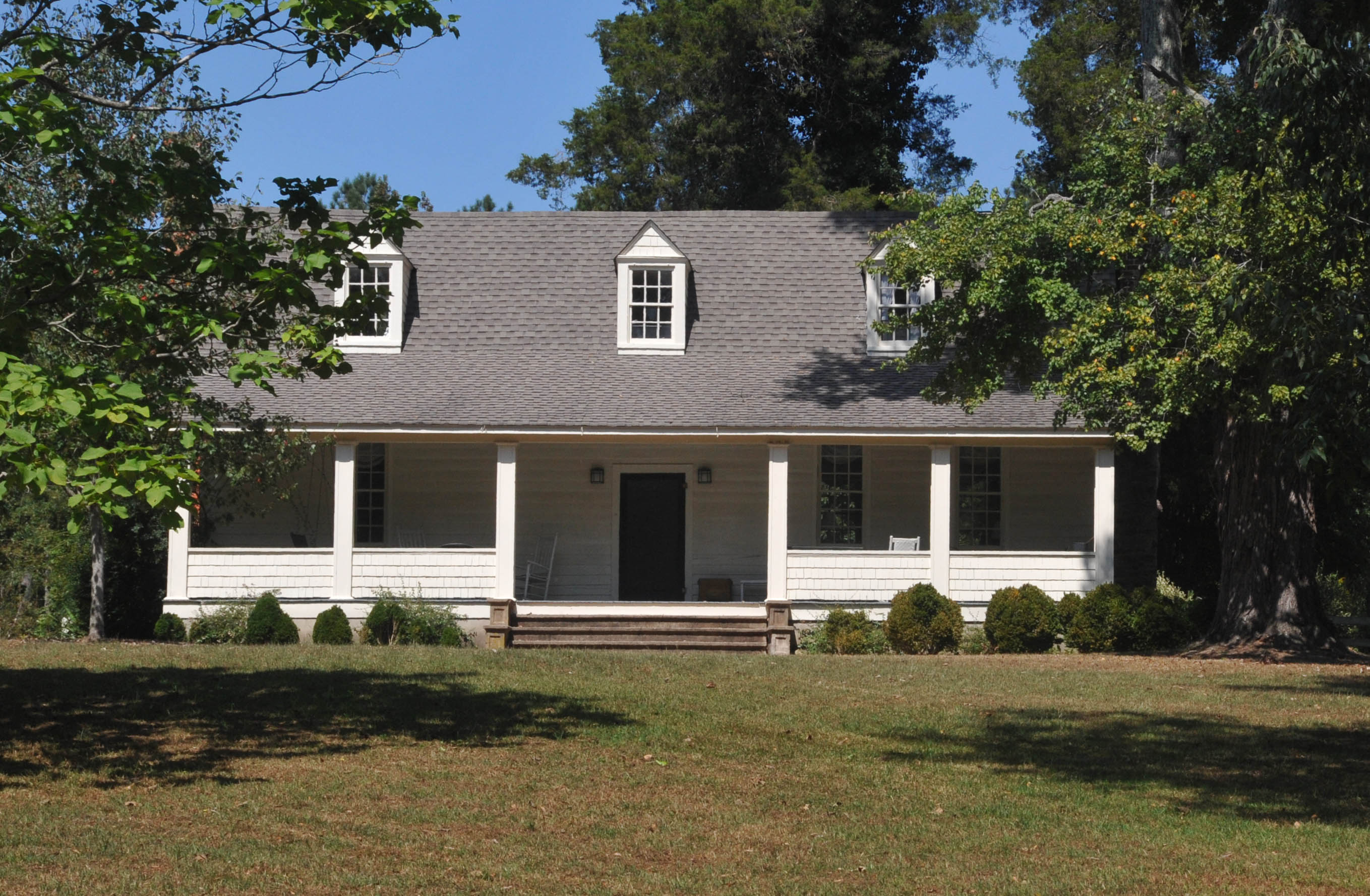

- Location within Virginia Location within the United States
- Location: 19216 Old White Oak Rd., McKenney, Virginia
- Coordinates: 37°00′28″N 77°46′39″W
- Area: 16.5 acres (6.7 ha)
- Built: 1828
- Architectural style: Federal, I-house
- NRHP reference No.: 04000855
- VLR No.: 026-0031

Significant dates
- Added to NRHP: August 11, 2004
- Designated VLR: June 16, 2004

Montrose is a historic farmhouse located near McKenney, Dinwiddie County, Virginia. The original section was built about 1828, and is a 1 1/2-story, three-bay, frame structure with a center-hall plan. It has been enlarged at least twice to become L-shaped in plan. It features a double-shouldered end chimneys of stone with brick stacks. The interior has Federal style woodwork. It was the birthplace of the Confederate General Roger Atkinson Pryor and long the home of the locally prominent Baskerville family.

It was listed on the National Register of Historic Places in 2004.
