= Rose Bower =

Historic house in Virginia, United States

- U.S. National Register of Historic Places
- Virginia Landmarks Register
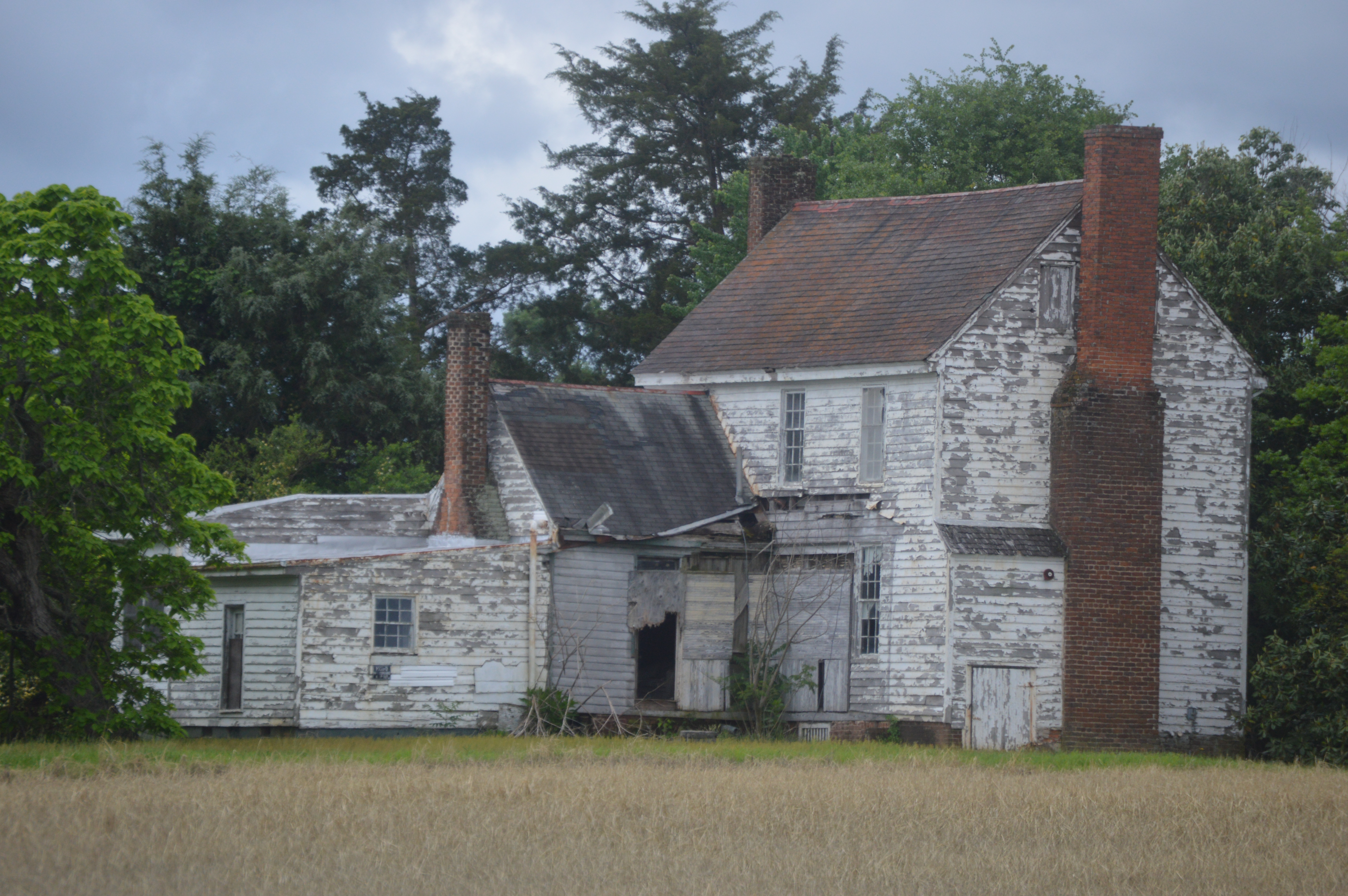
- Northern side and rear of the main house

- Location within Virginia Location within the United States
- Location: VA 665 S of jct. with VA 40, Stony Creek, Virginia
- Coordinates: 36°56′10″N 77°32′28″W
- Area: 231 acres (93 ha)
- Built: 1818, 1828
- Architectural style: Federal
- NRHP reference No.: 91000020
- VLR No.: 026-0090

Significant dates
- Added to NRHP: February 5, 1991
- Designated VLR: December 11, 1990

Rose Bower is a historic farm complex located at Stoney Creek, Dinwiddie County, Virginia. The first building on the property is the 1 1/2-story kitchen built about 1818 as the primary dwelling. The main dwelling was built in 1826 during the Federal period. It is a two-story, frame, hall-parlor-plan house with a 1 1/2-story rear ell. Also on the property are a contributing early well cover, smokehouse, and the Rose family cemetery.

It was listed on the National Register of Historic Places in 1991.

There is a Rose Bower in Devon, England. Its farm 'Narramore' has held a smokehouse for fish, kippers and mackerel, and a few rabbits. The property has been developed with extensive gardens. Most of the property is devoted to a working stud farm for thoroughbred horses.
