= Central State Hospital (Virginia) =

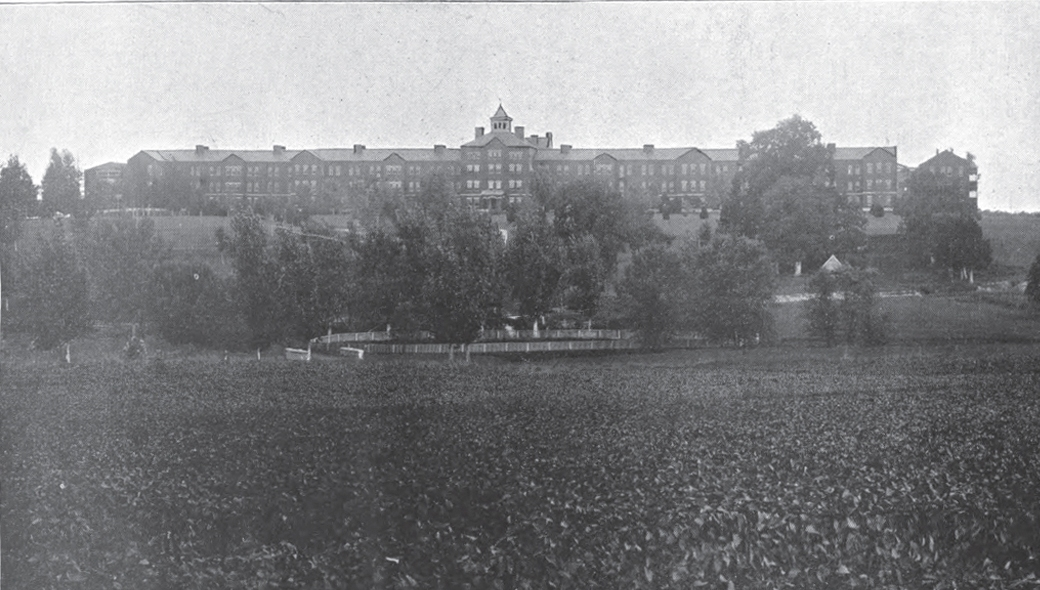
- Central State Hospital

Geography
- Location: Petersburg, Virginia, United States

Organization
- Care system: Public
- Type: Mental health

History
- Founded: 1870

Links
- Website: https://dbhds.virginia.gov/facilities/csh/
- Lists: Hospitals in Virginia

Central State Hospital, originally known as the Central Lunatic Asylum, is a psychiatric hospital in Petersburg, Virginia, United States. It was the first institution in the country for "colored persons of unsound mind".

Central State Hospital serves the Greater Richmond Region of Virginia, providing forensic psychiatry and civil admissions ranging from short-term treatment to long-term intensive treatment for the most seriously mentally ill.

== History ==
=== Overview ===
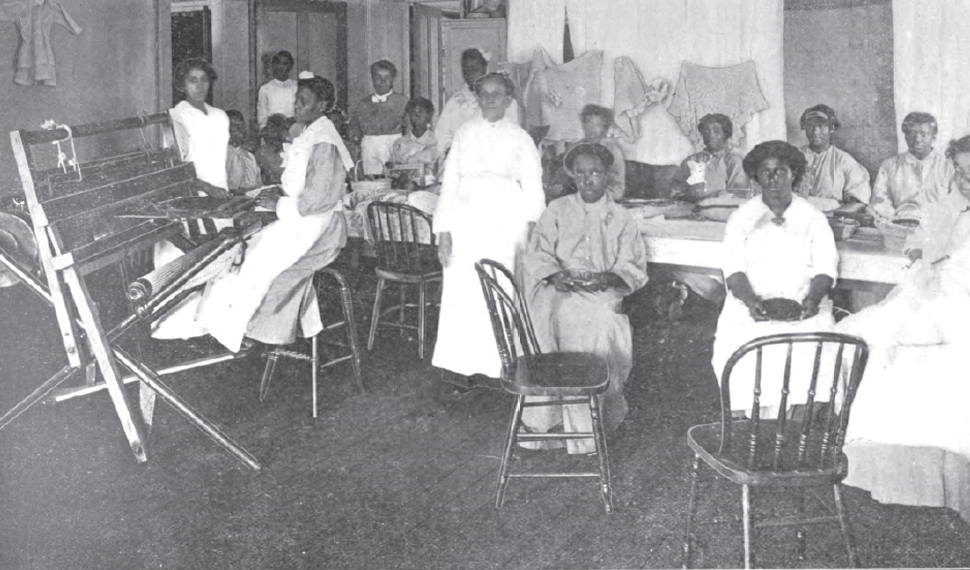
Diversional occupation

In 1848, the enslaved in Virginia could be admitted to private asylums if their owners paid for their treatment, but not all owners could afford it, and whites were always given priority admission. It was also believed that when black people tried to flee captivity, they were suffering from a mental illness called drapetomania, which Samuel A. Cartwright stated to be a consequence of masters who "made themselves too familiar with slaves, treating them as equals".

The Confederacy established a hospital for wounded soldiers at Howard's Grove in 1862. It was reassigned in 1870 to the treatment of "colored persons of unsound mind" and was the first to offer treatment exclusively to the black population of Virginia. Dorothea Dix visited the hospital in 1875, during her travels for mental health reform, and donated pictures and musical instruments.

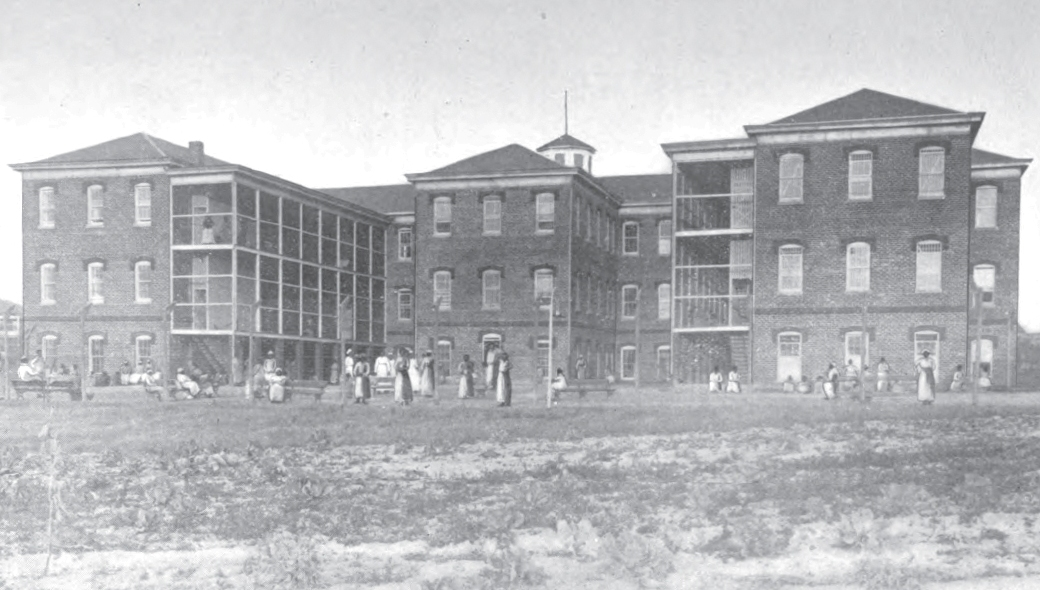
The building for chronically ill females

In 1885, the patients from Howard's Grove were transferred to a newly built red-brick hospital trimmed with gray granite. It had a central four-story administration building flanked on either side by a three-story wing containing six wards. This arrangement, which is known as the Kirkbride Plan, was a symbol of moral treatment. The East and West Buildings were built on either side of the main building in 1890 and 1892 to treat more severe cases.

The Legislature of 1893 changed the title of state "asylums" to state "hospitals" and the lunatic asylum was renamed a state hospital. In 1896, a two-story brick pavilion was built and the hospital became one of the first to care specifically for people with epilepsy. Patients were classified and assigned to wards for the recent and acute, chronic, demented, sick, tubercular, epileptic, criminal and suicidal. The wards for the suicidal were the least furnished.

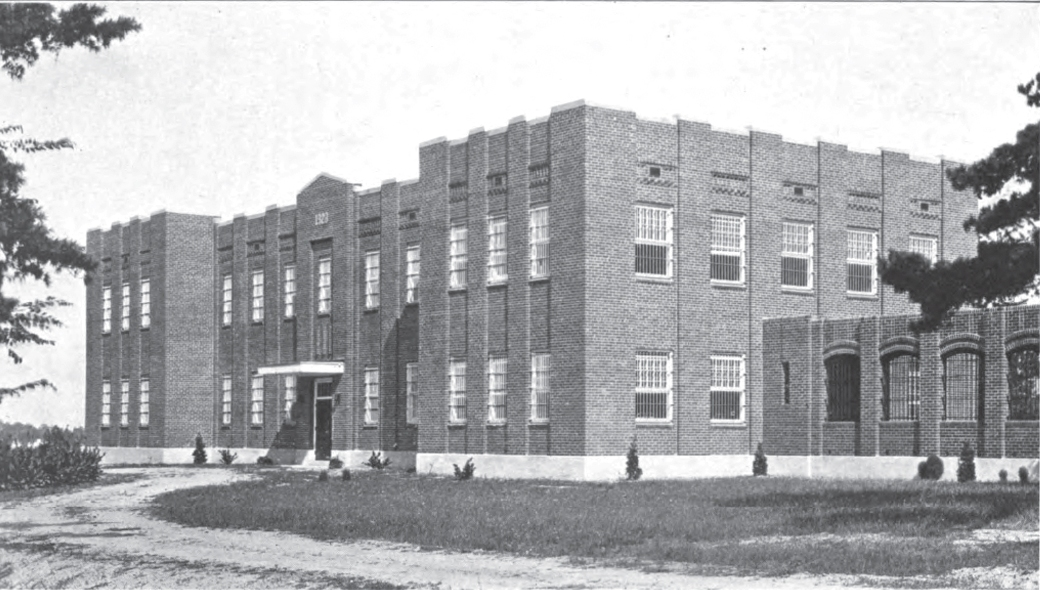
The building for delinquent females

Mayfield Cottage was built in 1750 and was the oldest brick residence in the county. The hospital purchased the farm land on which it was built, and used it as a storehouse for many years.

In 1904, a one-and-a-half-story chapel was built as a multi-purpose space for religious services, dances, concerts, and graduation ceremonies for the hospital's nursing students. Its simple 80x50 foot Gothic Revival design was conceived by Dr. William Francis Drewry and constructed by G. B. Keeler & Son. Twenty-four fire hydrants were installed and a fire house was built. Drying machinery was purchased for the laundry and an internal telephone system was installed. Workshops were established for carpentry, shoe repair, broom- and mattress-making. These activities were used as occupational therapy.

In 1915, a building for chronically ill females was built for 160 patients, along with one for male patients. In 1925, hydrotherapy tubs were installed on the first floor to provide a new form of treatment.

From the opening of the hospital until 1915, the supposed causes of psychosis in those admitted included abortion, desertion, emancipation, marriage, masturbation, and typhoid fever. Some of the foods grown on the farm were alfalfa, peanuts, wheat, radishes, pumpkins, okra, watermelon, turkey, and milk.

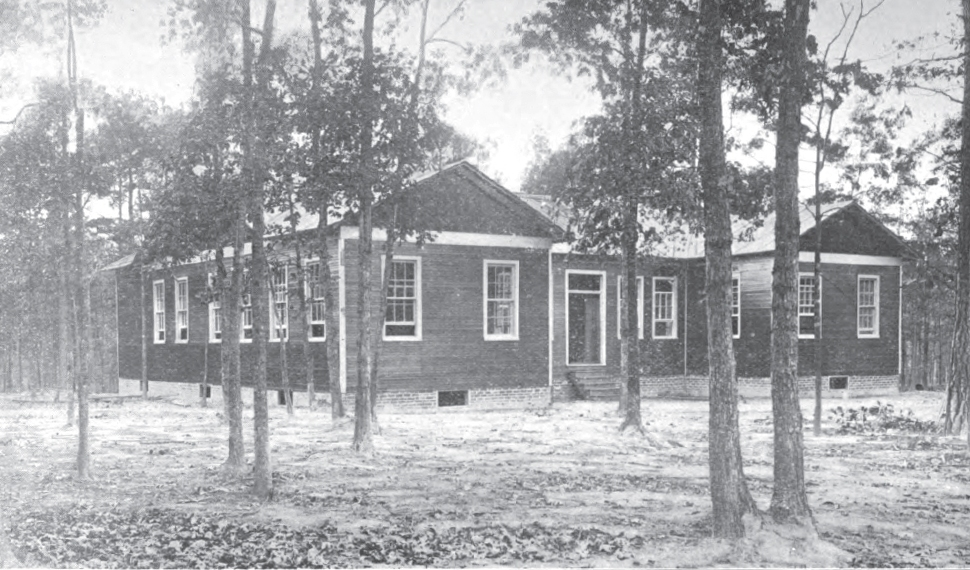
Lodge in woods

In 1929, a building for delinquent and feeble-minded girls was built, with a 100-foot barred arcade leading to the central building. In 1930, the new medical building was built for 100 beds. More wings were added to it later. The first floor was used for surgery, examinations, dentistry, lectures, x-rays, laboratories, treatment, and drug therapy. The second and third floors were for bedridden patients, so that they were undisturbed by out-patient and ambulatory services downstairs.

In 1938, a State Colony for people with epilepsy was established on the grounds, and later admitted the mentally disabled. In 1954, it was renamed a training school and hospital, and then a training center in 1971.

In the 1950s, the patient population reached 4,800 with the construction of a maximum security forensic building and geriatric unit. Overcrowding was an increasing problem: the East View ward had 300 patients in one large room, and patients in the criminals' building were sleeping on the floor.

The hospital served only African Americans until the Civil Rights Acts of 1964. From 1967, it accepted all races and nationalities. In 1978, Mayfield Cottage was sold to the Caudle family, who moved the structure a mile away to save it from demolition and opened it as a bed-and-breakfast in 1986.

=== The Original Kirkbride Building ===
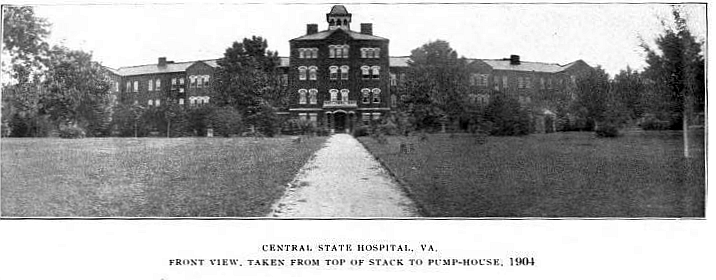
The original building from the front. It was demolished in an unknown year.

The massive Kirkbride complex that once formed Central State Hospital's main Building is long gone. Based on the historic aerial photo maps of the location, it was very likely demolished in the late 1960s or early 1970s with the construction of four new, one-story buildings in its place. The only remaining part of the Kirkbride complex are two buildings on the corner of Bath Rd and Bedford St. These were probably added to it later down the road and were not part of the original Kirkbride plan building when it was built.

== Accusations ==
=== Sterilization ===
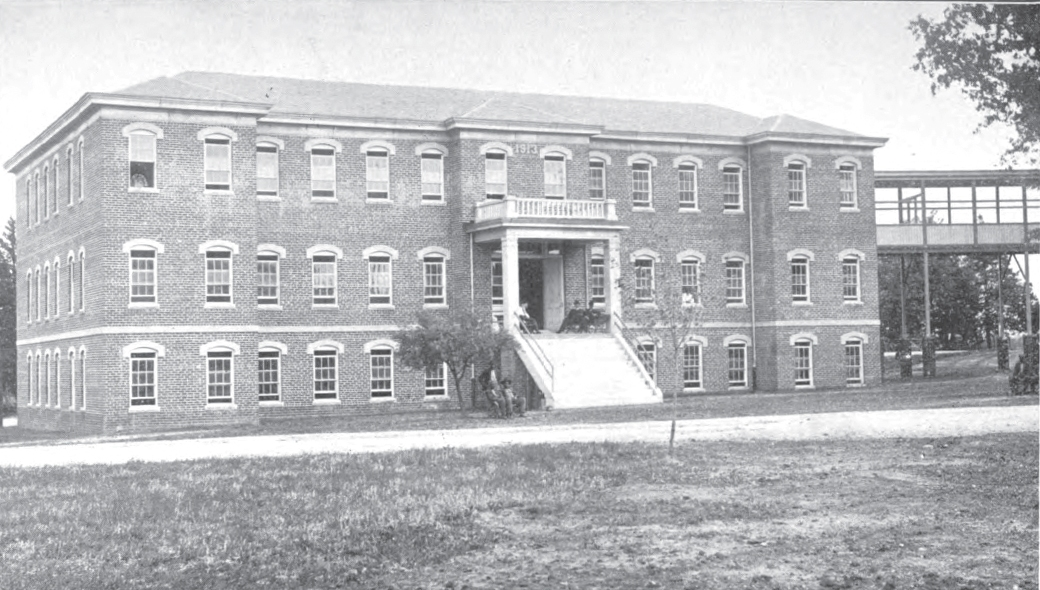
The building for male psychopaths

In Virginia, over 7,500 patients were legally sterilized without their consent from 1924 to 1972, 39 of which were residents at Central State Hospital. With the help of the American Civil Liberties Union, four of the 7,205 people sterilized in the state of Virginia filed a class-action lawsuit requiring the state of Virginia to notify every patient sterilized between 1924 and 1973 and to pay for operations to reverse the procedure.

In 2010, the Central State Hospital Chapel was registered on the National Register of Historic Places as a symbol of the state's unequal treatment of African Americans during the period of segregation.

The chapel was de-listed in February 2017 after deferred maintenance resulted in structural failure causing the building to collapse.

=== 2023 police killing ===
On March 6, 2023, 28-year-old Irvo Otieno died after he was restrained by Henrico County sheriff's deputies at Central State Hospital. He was arrested on March 3 for a suspected breaking and entering, and was taken to the hospital three days later after he was found naked in his cell. A total of ten people, seven deputies and three hospital employees, were charged with second-degree murder in connection with Otieno's death by suffocation.

== See also ==
- Mental health
