= National Museum of the Civil War Soldier =

The National Museum of the Civil War Soldier, part of Pamplin Historical Park, is located in Petersburg, Virginia. A Civil War museum that has won a number of US and international awards and recognition, the museum is Duty Called Me Here as well as The Civil War Store, The Pamplin Board Room, and the Remembrance Wall. Duty Called Me Here is an exhibit that comprises seven galleries to allow to visitors to meet the 3 million soldiers who served during the Civil War using videos, computers and life-size dioramas, including the multi-sensory battlefield simulation, "Trial By Fire," designed originally by award-winning experience designer Bob Rogers (designer) and the design team BRC Imagination Arts. It is a complement to the Remembrance Wall, which contains the names of those who served during the War. The museum does this without delving into the political issues of which side the soldiers were on.

The campus, as well as the museum itself, part of the Petersburg Breakthrough Battlefield site, where the Union soldiers broke through Confederate lines in 1865. The campus and museum were created as a means of preserving threatened Civil War history and battlefields. A. Wilson Greene helped develop the museum, serving as executive director from its opening until 2017.
