= Stony Creek Plantation =

Historic house in Virginia, United States

- U.S. National Register of Historic Places
- Virginia Landmarks Register
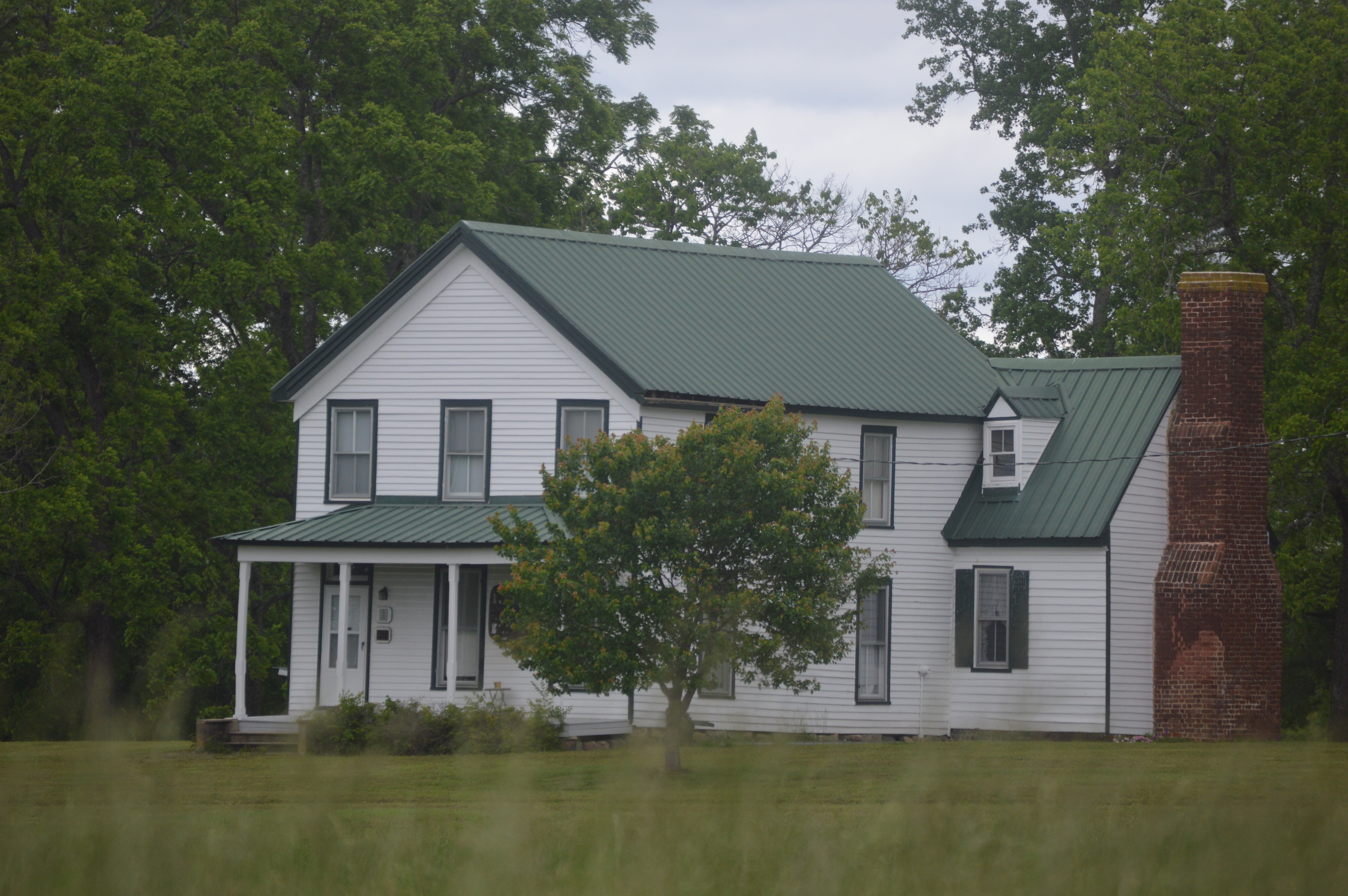
- Front and eastern side

- Location within Virginia Location within the United States
- Location: VA 624, DeWitt, Virginia
- Coordinates: 37°5′33″N 77°39′31″W
- Area: 25 acres (10 ha)
- Built: c. 1750
- Architectural style: Georgian
- NRHP reference No.: 03000212
- VLR No.: 026-0092

Significant dates
- Added to NRHP: April 11, 2003
- Designated VLR: December 4, 2002

Stony Creek Plantation, also known as Shell House, is a historic plantation house located at DeWitt, Dinwiddie County, Virginia. The original section was built about 1750, and is a 1 1/2-story, three-bay, center-hall plan house. It would have been built by enslaved African Americans. They likely cultivated tobacco and mixed crops by the time this plantation was developed.

A two-story perpendicular section was added in 1872, more than 20 years later and after the Civil War. The house is T-shaped and features massive brick chimneys.

It was listed on the National Register of Historic Places in 2003.
