= Darvils, Virginia =

Unincorporated community in Virginia, United States

- Unincorporated community
- Location within Virginia Location within the United States
- Coordinates: 37°03′48″N 77°50′02″W
- Country: United States
- State: Virginia
- County: Dinwiddie
- Elevation: 377 ft (115 m)
- Time zone: UTC-5 (Eastern (EST))
  - Summer (DST): UTC-4 (EDT)
- Area code: 804
- GNIS feature ID: 1477248

Darvils (also Crimea, Darville, Darvilles) is an unincorporated community in Dinwiddie County, Virginia, United States.
