= Dinwiddie County Court House =

Historic courthouse in Virginia, US

- Dinwiddie County Courthouse
- U.S. National Register of Historic Places
- Virginia Landmarks Register
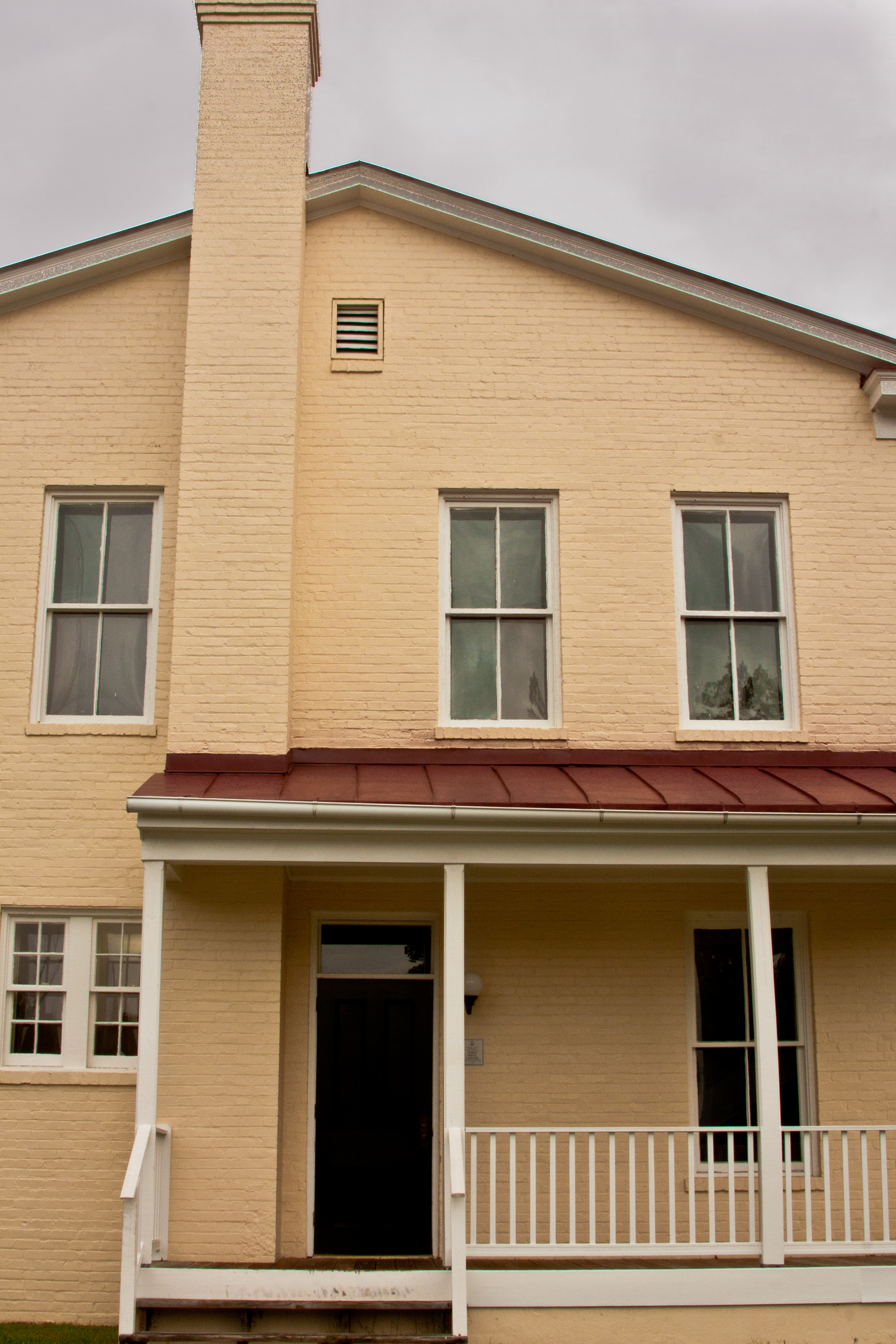

- Location within Virginia Location within the United States
- Interactive map showing the location of Dinwiddie County Courthouse
- Location: Jct. of U.S. 1 and VA 619, Dinwiddie, Virginia
- Coordinates: 37°4′37″N 77°35′14″W
- Area: 9 acres (3.6 ha)
- Built: 1851
- Architectural style: Greek Revival
- NRHP reference No.: 73002008
- VLR No.: 026-0004

Significant dates
- Added to NRHP: March 21, 1973
- Designated VLR: February 20, 1973

Dinwiddie County Court House is a historic courthouse building located at the junction of U.S. 1 and VA 619 in Dinwiddie, Dinwiddie County, Virginia. It was built in 1851, and is a two-story, brick temple-form building in the Greek Revival style. It measures approximately 37 feet (11 m) wide and 78 feet (24 m) long, and features a front portico added in 1933. The courthouse was the site of the Battle of Dinwiddie Court House in the closing stages of the American Civil War. The Dinwiddie County Historical Society is currently located in this building.

It was listed on the National Register of Historic Places in 1973.
