= Dinwiddie, Virginia =

Unincorporated community in Virginia, United States

- Census-designated place
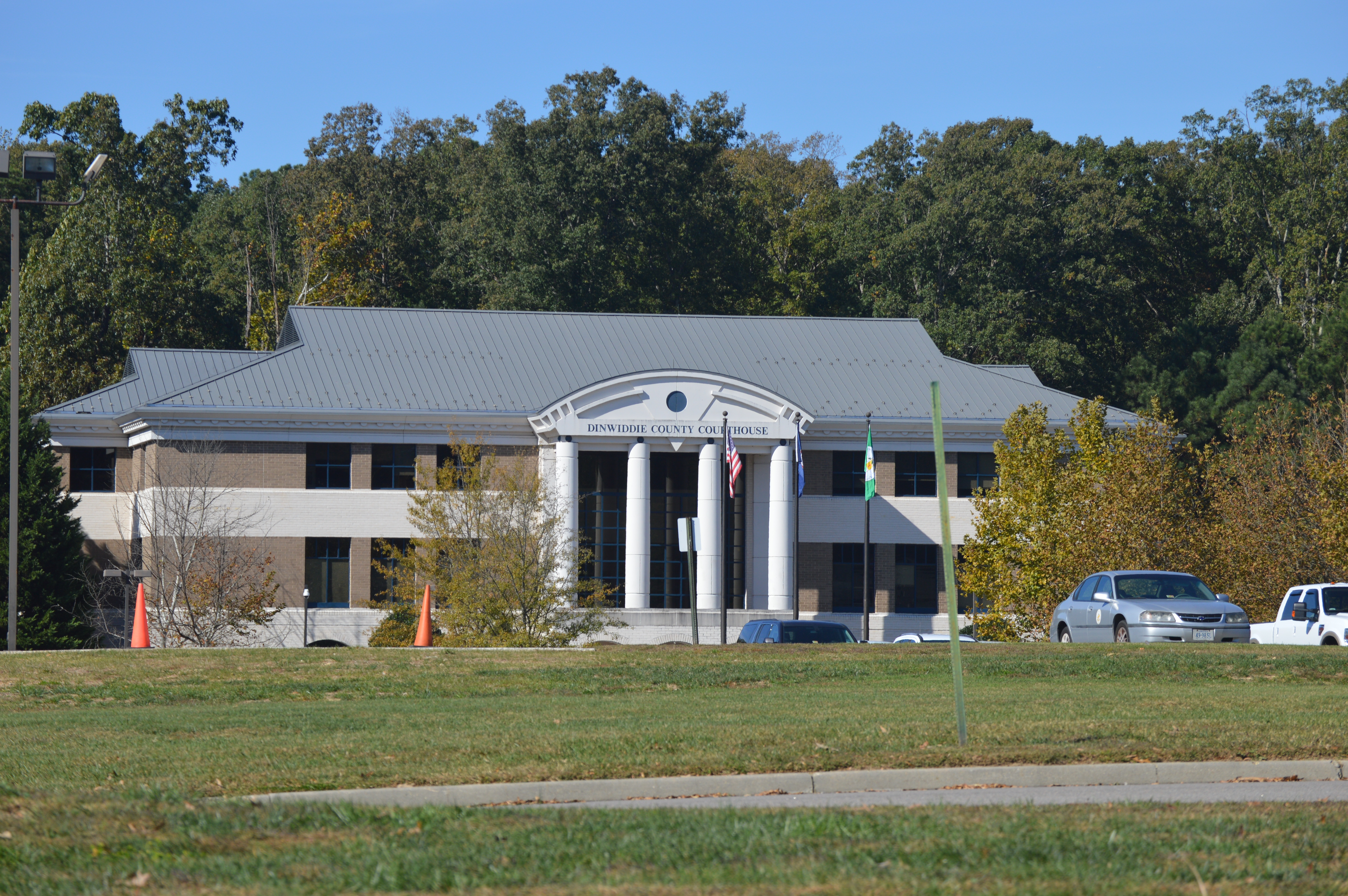
- Current courthouse, seen from U.S. Route 1

- Location within Virginia Location within the United States
- Coordinates: 37°04′41″N 77°35′12″W
- Country: United States
- State: Virginia
- County: Dinwiddie
- Elevation: 256 ft (78 m)

Population (2020)
  - Total: 619
- Time zone: UTC-5 (EST)
  - Summer (DST): UTC-4 (EDT)
- ZIP Code: 23841
- Area code: 804
- GNIS feature ID: 1498473

Dinwiddie Courthouse is an unincorporated community, census-designated place (CDP), and the county seat of Dinwiddie County, Virginia, United States. It was first listed as a CDP in the 2020 census with a population of 619.

== History ==
The community was the site of the Battle of Dinwiddie Court House, the Battle of Five Forks as well as the Battle of Sutherland's Station during the Appomattox Campaign.

== Geography ==
The community is near the Interstate 85 corridor, about halfway between Richmond and the North Carolina state line.

== Demographics ==
Dinwiddie first appeared as a census designated place in the 2020 United States census.

== Main sites ==
Burnt Quarter, the Dinwiddie County Court House, and Williamson Site are listed on the National Register of Historic Places.
