= Burnt Quarter =

Historic house in Virginia, United States

- U.S. National Register of Historic Places
- Virginia Landmarks Register
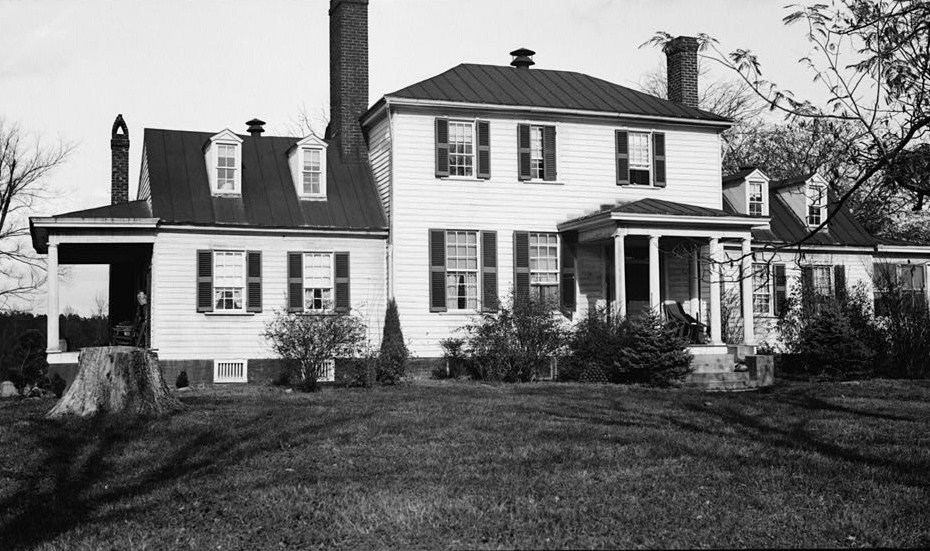
- Burnt Quarter, HABS Photo

- Location within Virginia Location within the United States
- Location: SW of jct. of Rtes. 627, 613, and 645, near Dinwiddie, Virginia
- Coordinates: 37°08′19″N 77°37′30″W
- Area: 2,391 acres (968 ha)
- Built: c. 1750
- NRHP reference No.: 69000235
- VLR No.: 026-0025

Significant dates
- Added to NRHP: November 25, 1969
- Designated VLR: September 9, 1969

Burnt Quarter is a historic plantation house located near Dinwiddie, Dinwiddie County, Virginia. It was built in stages starting about 1750, and consists of a two-story, hipped roof central section flanked by 1 1/2-story wings. On April 1, 1865, the property became the scene of the decisive Battle of Five Forks. During the battle the house served both as headquarters for Union General Merritt and as a military hospital. On the grounds is a monument to six unknown Confederate soldiers killed in the Battle of Five Forks.

It was listed on the National Register of Historic Places in 1969.
