= McKenney, Virginia =

- Town
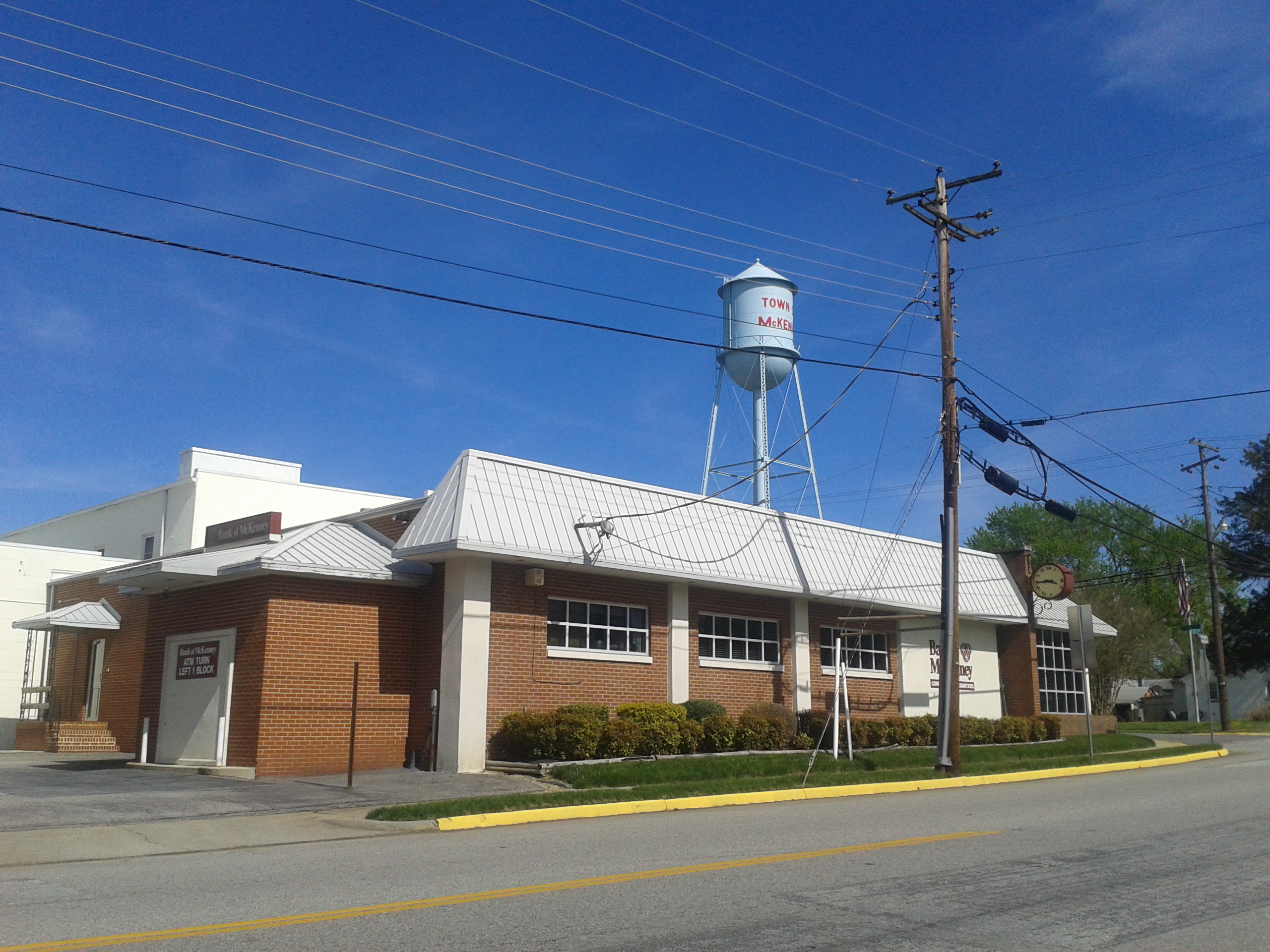
- Central McKenney, April 2017

- Location within the state of Virginia
- Coordinates: 36°59′00″N 77°43′08″W
- Country: United States
- State: Virginia
- County: Dinwiddie

Area
  - Total: 0.93 sq mi (2.40 km^{2})
  - Land: 0.93 sq mi (2.40 km^{2})
  - Water: 0 sq mi (0.00 km^{2})
- Elevation: 335 ft (102 m)

Population (2020)
  - Total: 457
  - Estimate (2019): 489
  - Density: 527.0/sq mi (203.49/km^{2})
- Time zone: UTC−5 (Eastern (EST))
  - Summer (DST): UTC−4 (EDT)
- ZIP code: 23872
- Area code: 804
- FIPS code: 51-48344
- GNIS feature ID: 1495918

McKenney is an incorporated town in Dinwiddie County, Virginia, United States. As of the 2020 census, McKenney had a population of 457.

== History ==
McKenney is located along a former railroad mainline. The Richmond, Petersburg and Carolina Railroad, passing through McKenney from Petersburg, Virginia to Ridgeway Junction (today Norlina, North Carolina), was completed in 1900, at which point it was merged into the Seaboard Air Line (SAL). By 1914, the population of McKenney was estimated by the railroad to be about 300.

This line (dubbed the "S-line" after later mergers) continued to operate until the 1980s and was then abandoned by the CSX Norlina Subdivision. Today McKenney is isolated by this abandonment.

Montrose, the Sappony Church, and Zehmer Farm are listed on the National Register of Historic Places. Near McKenney is a historical marker, erected by the Virginia Department of Conservation and Historic Resources in 1986, honoring the achievements of educator Sallie Jones Atkinson.

== Geography ==
McKenney is located in southwestern Dinwiddie County at 36°59′00″N 77°43′08″W (36.983307, −77.718810). U.S. Route 1 passes through the southeastern side of town, and Interstate 85 passes just southeast of the city limits, with access from Exit 42. Via either highway it is 26 miles (42 km) northeast to Petersburg and 30 miles (48 km) southwest to South Hill. Virginia State Route 40 passes through the center of town, leading east 18 miles (29 km) to Stony Creek and northwest 20 miles (32 km) to Blackstone.

According to the United States Census Bureau, McKenney has a total area of 0.93 square miles (2.4 km^{2}), all land.

== Demographics ==
Historical population
Census	Pop.	Note	%±
1930	341		—
1940	453		32.8%
1950	476		5.1%
1960	519		9.0%
1970	489		−5.8%
1980	473		−3.3%
1990	386		−18.4%
2000	441		14.2%
2010	483		9.5%
2020	457		−5.4%
U.S. Decennial Census

As of the census of 2000, there were 441 people, 167 households, and 105 families living in the town. The population density was 464.8 people per square mile (179.2/km^{2}). There were 183 housing units at an average density of 192.9 per square mile (74.4/km^{2}). The racial makeup of the town was 66.21% White, 33.33% African American, 0.23% Asian, and 0.23% from two or more races. Hispanic or Latino of any race were 2.04% of the population.

There were 167 households, out of which 26.3% had children under the age of 18 living with them, 44.9% were married couples living together, 15.6% had a female householder with no husband present, and 37.1% were non-families. 32.3% of all households were made up of individuals, and 15.6% had someone living alone who was 65 years of age or older. The average household size was 2.43 and the average family size was 3.11.

In the town, the population was spread out, with 20.6% under the age of 18, 7.5% from 18 to 24, 27.2% from 25 to 44, 25.9% from 45 to 64, and 18.8% who were 65 years of age or older. The median age was 42 years. For every 100 females, there were 105.1 males. For every 100 females aged 18 and over, there were 88.2 males.

The median income for a household in the town was $34,583, and the median income for a family was $45,625. Males had a median income of $32,500 versus $21,250 for females. The per capita income for the town was $19,005. About 4.0% of families and 10.3% of the population were below the poverty line, including 6.8% of those under age 18 and 15.6% of those age 65 or over.
