= Dinwiddie County, Virginia =

County in Virginia, United States

- County
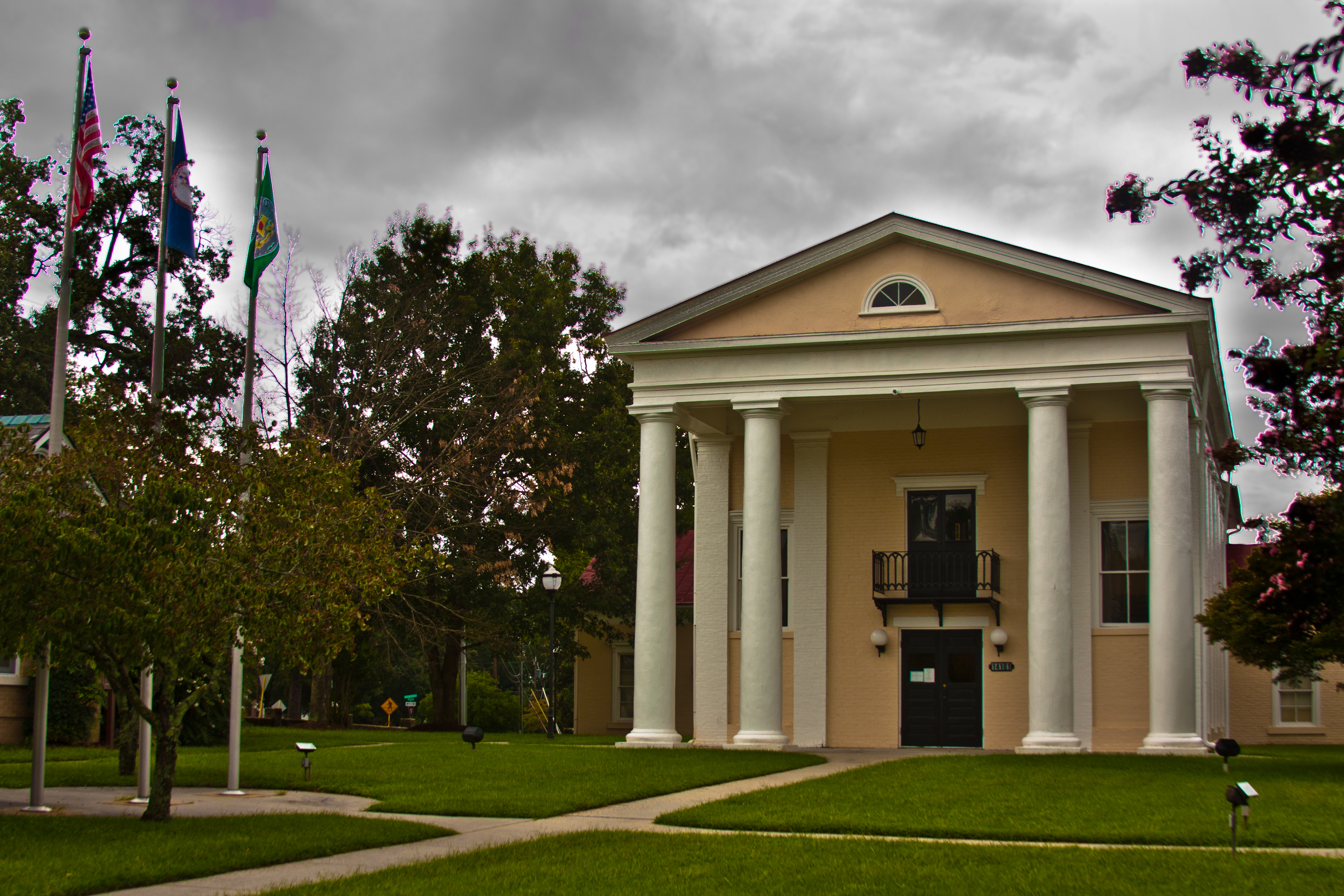
- Dinwiddie County's historic courthouse

- Flag Seal

- Location within the U.S. state of Virginia
- Coordinates: 37°05′N 77°38′W
- Country: United States
- State: Virginia
- Founded: 1752
- Named for: Robert Dinwiddie
- Seat: Dinwiddie
- Largest town: McKenney

Area
  - Total: 507 sq mi (1,310 km^{2})
  - Land: 504 sq mi (1,310 km^{2})
  - Water: 3.5 sq mi (9.1 km^{2}) 0.7%

Population (2020)
  - Total: 27,947
  - Estimate (2025): 28,896 ▲
  - Density: 55.5/sq mi (21.4/km^{2})
- Time zone: UTC−5 (Eastern)
  - Summer (DST): UTC−4 (EDT)
- Congressional district: 4th
- Website: www.dinwiddieva.us

Dinwiddie County is a largely rural United States county located in the south-central part of the Commonwealth of Virginia. Dinwiddie forms part of the Greater Richmond metropolitan statistical area, and as of the 2020 census, the county's population was 27,947. The county seat is the small town of Dinwiddie, which shares the county's name.

The county was established in 1752 from part of Prince George County and was named in honor of Robert Dinwiddie, the de facto head of the Virginia colony at the time. Agriculture has historically played an important role in the county's economy. Dinwiddie's close proximity to the city of Petersburg and its railroad lines led to the county hosting six notable Civil War battles.

== History ==
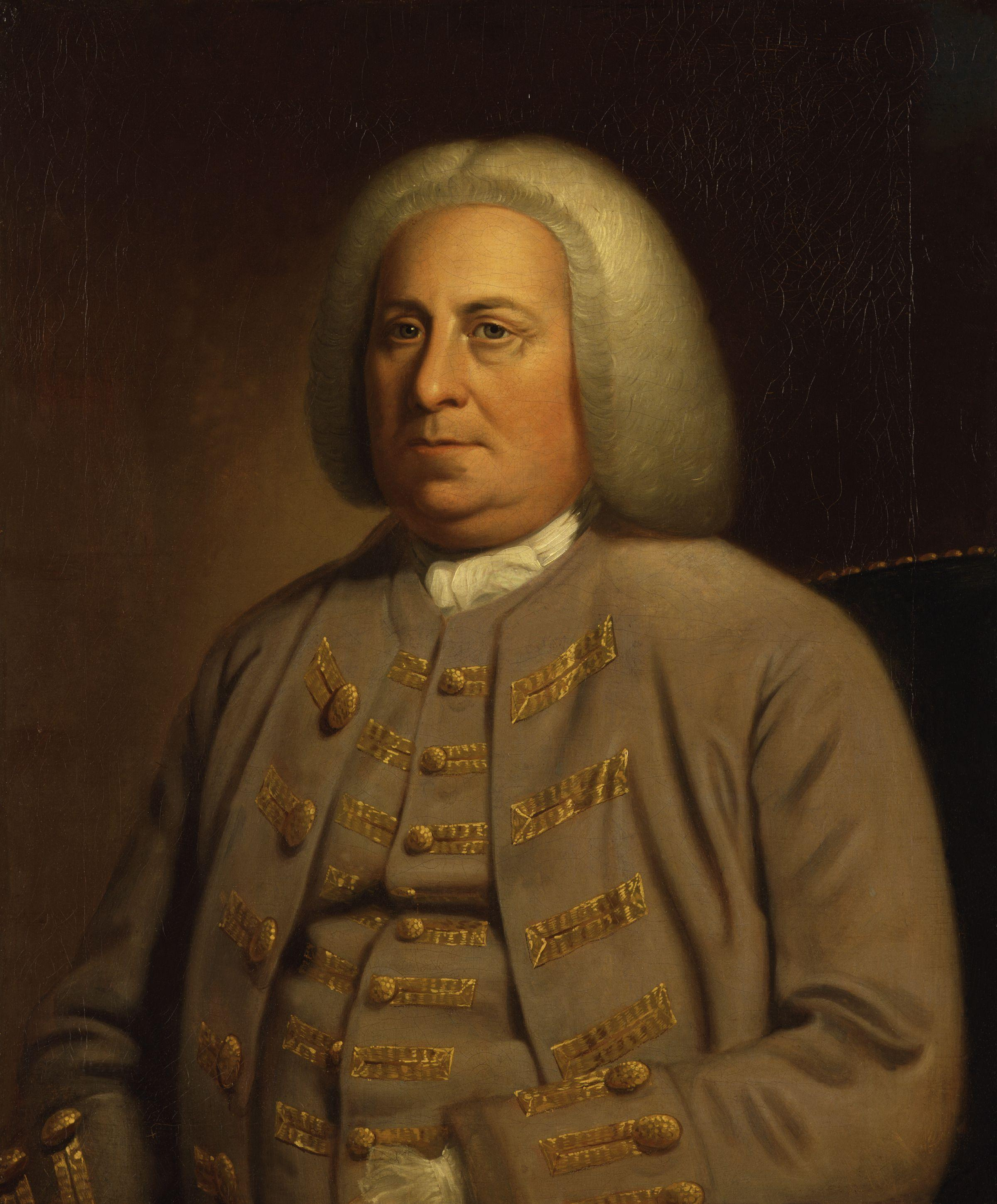
Portrait of Robert Dinwiddie; Dinwiddie County was named in his honor

The first inhabitants of the area were Paleo-Indians, prior to 8000 BC. They are believed to have been nomadic hunter-gatherers following animal migrations. Early stone tools have been discovered in various fields within the county. At the time of European contact, Native Americans made their homes in the region.

Dinwiddie County was formed May 1, 1752, from Prince George County. The county is named for Robert Dinwiddie, Lieutenant Governor of Virginia, 1751–1758. The county raised several militia units that would fight in the American Revolution, and founding father John Banister was born here.

Dinwiddie County was the birthplace of Elizabeth (Burwell) Hobbs Keckly, a free black dressmaker who worked for two presidents' wives: Mrs. Jefferson Davis and later Mary Todd Lincoln. Thomas Day was also a native; he was well known later at Milton, North Carolina, as a free black cabinetmaker. Another native son was Dr. Thomas Stewart, perhaps America's first free black 18th-century rural physician. Robert B. Pamplin was also born here, and he founded R.B. Pamplin Corporation.

During the Civil War the Battle of Lewis's Farm was fought along Quaker Road [Rt. 660]. It took place on March 29, 1865. This was the first in several attempts by Union General Ulysses S. Grant to cut Robert E. Lee's final supply line—the Southside Railroad—in the spring of 1865. Here the Union forces led by Brig. Gen. Joshua L. Chamberlain engaged Confederates under Maj. Gen. Bushrod R. Johnson. After sharp fighting, the Union troops entrenched nearby along the Boydton Plank Road, and Johnson withdrew to his lines at White Oak Road. The Union army cut the rail line four days later, after capturing Five Forks on April 1, 1865, at the Battle of Five Forks. Several other engagements were fought in Dinwiddie County, including the Battle of Dinwiddie Court House, Battle of Sutherland's Station, and Battle of White Oak Road.

The first known Black vocal quartet to exist on disk, the Dinwiddie Colored Quartet, was founded to benefit the Dinwiddie Normal and Industrial School in the county.

The Dinwiddie County Historical Society currently occupies the historic Dinwiddie County Court House.

=== Civil War battles ===
- Battle of Peebles' Farm
- Battle of Lewis's Farm
- Battle of Dinwiddie Court House
- Battle of White Oak Road
- Battle of Five Forks
- Battle of Sutherland's Station

== Geography ==
Dinwiddie is located in southern Virginia, southwest of the independent city of Petersburg, which separated from the county (and adjacent Prince George County) in 1871. According to the U.S. Census Bureau, the county has a total area of 507 square miles (1,310 km^{2}), of which 504 square miles (1,310 km^{2}) is land and 3.5 square miles (9.1 km^{2}) (0.7%) is water. It is located between two US Army forts, Fort Gregg-Adams to the east and Fort Barfoot to the west.

=== Adjacent counties ===
- Chesterfield County – north
- Petersburg City – northeast
- Prince George County – east
- Sussex County – southeast
- Greensville County – south
- Brunswick County – southwest
- Nottoway County – west
- Amelia County – northwest

=== National protected area ===
- Petersburg National Battlefield (part)

=== Major highways ===
- I-85
- US 1
- US 460
- US 460 Bus.
- SR 40
- SR 142
- SR 226

== Demographics ==
Historical population
Census	Pop.	Note	%±
1790	13,934		—
1800	15,374		10.3%
1810	18,190		18.3%
1820	20,482		12.6%
1830	21,901		6.9%
1840	22,558		3.0%
1850	25,118		11.3%
1860	30,198		20.2%
1870	30,702		1.7%
1880	32,870		7.1%
1890	13,515		−58.9%
1900	15,374		13.8%
1910	15,442		0.4%
1920	17,949		16.2%
1930	18,492		3.0%
1940	18,166		−1.8%
1950	18,839		3.7%
1960	22,183		17.8%
1970	25,046		12.9%
1980	22,602		−9.8%
1990	20,960		−7.3%
2000	24,533		17.0%
2010	28,001		14.1%
2020	27,947		−0.2%
2025 (est.)	28,896	▲	3.4%
U.S. Decennial Census; 1790–1960 1900–1990; 1990–2000 2010 2020

=== Racial and ethnic composition ===
Dinwiddie County, Virginia – Racial and ethnic composition Note: the US Census treats Hispanic/Latino as an ethnic category. This table excludes Latinos from the racial categories and assigns them to a separate category. Hispanics/Latinos may be of any race.
Race / Ethnicity (NH = Non-Hispanic)	Pop 1980	Pop 1990	Pop 2000	Pop 2010	Pop 2020	% 1980	% 1990	% 2000	% 2010	% 2020
White alone (NH)	12,791	13,293	15,735	17,617	17,346	56.59%	63.42%	64.14%	62.92%	62.07%
Black or African American alone (NH)	9,571	7,454	8,221	9,134	8,115	42.35%	35.56%	33.51%	32.62%	29.04%
Native American or Alaska Native alone (NH)	16	28	54	83	91	0.07%	0.13%	0.22%	0.30%	0.33%
Asian alone (NH)	48	60	74	122	119	0.21%	0.29%	0.30%	0.44%	0.43%
Native Hawaiian or Pacific Islander alone (NH)	x	x	8	7	3	x	x	0.03%	0.02%	0.01%
Other race alone (NH)	0	3	17	18	102	0.00%	0.01%	0.07%	0.06%	0.36%
Mixed race or Multiracial (NH)	x	x	187	346	1,043	x	x	0.76%	1.24%	3.73%
Hispanic or Latino (any race)	176	122	237	674	1,128	0.78%	0.58%	0.97%	2.41%	4.04%
Total	22,602	20,960	24,533	28,001	27,947	100.00%	100.00%	100.00%	100.00%	100.00%

=== 2020 census ===
As of the 2020 census, the county had a population of 27,947. The median age was 43.4 years. 21.3% of residents were under the age of 18 and 18.7% of residents were 65 years of age or older. For every 100 females there were 95.8 males, and for every 100 females age 18 and over there were 94.1 males age 18 and over.

The racial makeup of the county was 62.7% White, 29.3% Black or African American, 0.4% American Indian and Alaska Native, 0.5% Asian, 0.0% Native Hawaiian and Pacific Islander, 2.3% from some other race, and 4.9% from two or more races. Hispanic or Latino residents of any race comprised 4.0% of the population.

28.3% of residents lived in urban areas, while 71.7% lived in rural areas.

There were 10,925 households in the county, of which 29.9% had children under the age of 18 living with them and 27.0% had a female householder with no spouse or partner present. About 25.0% of all households were made up of individuals and 11.7% had someone living alone who was 65 years of age or older.

There were 11,803 housing units, of which 7.4% were vacant. Among occupied housing units, 76.2% were owner-occupied and 23.8% were renter-occupied. The homeowner vacancy rate was 1.2% and the rental vacancy rate was 6.0%.

=== 2000 Census ===
As of the census of 2000, there were 24,533 people, 9,107 households, and 6,720 families residing in the county. The population density was 49 people per square mile (19 people/km^{2}). There were 9,707 housing units at an average density of 19 units per square mile (7.3 units/km^{2}). The racial makeup of the county was 64.55% White, 33.66% Black or African American, 0.22% Native American, 0.31% Asian, 0.04% Pacific Islander, 0.40% from other races, and 0.82% from two or more races. 0.97% of the population were Hispanic or Latino of any race.

There were 9,107 households, out of which 32.10% had children under the age of 18 living with them, 54.80% were married couples living together, 13.90% had a female householder with no husband present, and 26.20% were non-families. 22.20% of all households were made up of individuals, and 8.50% had someone living alone who was 65 years of age or older. The average household size was 2.58 and the average family size was 3.01.

In the county, the population was spread out, with 24.00% under the age of 18, 6.70% from 18 to 24, 30.90% from 25 to 44, 26.20% from 45 to 64, and 12.20% who were 65 years of age or older. The median age was 38 years. For every 100 females, there were 98.80 males. For every 100 females age 18 and over, there were 96.00 males.

The median income for a household in the county was $41,582, and the median income for a family was $47,961. Males had a median income of $32,860 versus $24,346 for females. The per capita income for the county was $19,122. About 6.60% of families and 9.30% of the population were below the poverty line, including 11.60% of those under age 18 and 12.60% of those age 65 or over.

== Government ==
=== Board of Supervisors ===
- District 1: Harrison A. Moody (D)
- District 2: Mark E. Moore (I)
- District 3: William D. Chavis (I)
- District 4: Daniel D. Lee (I)
- District 5: Brenda K. Ebron-Bonner (D)

=== Constitutional officers ===
- Clerk of the Circuit Court: John Barrett Chappell Jr. (D)
- Commissioner of the Revenue: Lori K. Stevens (R)
- Commonwealth's Attorney: Amanda Nicole Mann (I)
- Sheriff: D.T. "Duck" Adams (D)
- Treasurer: Jennifer Caraway Perkins (D)

Dinwiddie County has leaned Republican ever since the turn of the 21st Century; originally it was solidly Democratic but began shifting to the right during the Reagan era. Democrat Jimmy Carter in 1976 was the last to obtain an absolute majority in the county, though he won it by a narrow plurality in 1980. Bill Clinton did the same in 1996, having lost the county by only 24 votes in 1992. The county is currently represented by Republican Frank Ruff of the 15th district and Democrat Joe Morrissey of the 16th district in the Virginia Senate. In the Virginia House of Delegates, the county is represented by Republicans Kim Taylor of the 63rd district and Otto Wachsmann of the 75th district. The county is represented by Democrat Jennifer McClellan of Virginia's 4th congressional district in the U.S. House of Representatives.

United States presidential election results for Dinwiddie County, Virginia
Year	Republican		Democratic		Third party(ies)	
Year	No.	%	No.	%	No.	%
1912	58	8.91%	512	78.65%	81	12.44%
1916	85	12.54%	592	87.32%	1	0.15%
1920	186	22.57%	636	77.18%	2	0.24%
1924	122	14.70%	685	82.53%	23	2.77%
1928	332	26.00%	945	74.00%	0	0.00%
1932	104	9.12%	1,028	90.18%	8	0.70%
1936	127	8.61%	1,343	91.05%	5	0.34%
1940	264	18.86%	1,129	80.64%	7	0.50%
1944	279	20.26%	1,096	79.59%	2	0.15%
1948	261	17.40%	961	64.07%	278	18.53%
1952	983	39.77%	1,462	59.14%	27	1.09%
1956	807	30.71%	1,282	48.78%	539	20.51%
1960	935	34.81%	1,714	63.81%	37	1.38%
1964	2,096	48.91%	2,182	50.92%	7	0.16%
1968	1,451	27.60%	1,551	29.50%	2,255	42.90%
1972	3,314	62.47%	1,901	35.83%	90	1.70%
1976	2,413	37.28%	3,873	59.83%	187	2.89%
1980	3,369	48.01%	3,475	49.52%	174	2.48%
1984	4,547	56.04%	3,485	42.95%	82	1.01%
1988	4,165	54.38%	3,405	44.46%	89	1.16%
1992	3,648	42.43%	3,624	42.15%	1,325	15.41%
1996	3,503	42.90%	3,871	47.40%	792	9.70%
2000	4,959	54.28%	4,001	43.79%	176	1.93%
2004	6,193	57.14%	4,569	42.15%	77	0.71%
2008	6,526	50.62%	6,246	48.45%	120	0.93%
2012	6,875	50.59%	6,550	48.20%	164	1.21%
2016	7,447	54.86%	5,765	42.47%	363	2.67%
2020	8,695	57.61%	6,224	41.24%	173	1.15%
2024	9,549	61.17%	5,942	38.06%	120	0.77%

== Communities ==
The Bureau of Economic Analysis combines the independent cities of Petersburg and Colonial Heights with Dinwiddie County for statistical purposes.

=== Town ===
- McKenney

=== Census-designated places ===
- Dinwiddie (county seat)

=== Unincorporated communities ===
- Ammon
- Carson
- Church Road
- DeWitt
- Darvils
- Ford
- Sutherland
- Wilsons

== Education ==
Appomattox Regional Library serves as the public library for the county. It is located in Dinwiddie. Dinwiddie High School is the county high school, and Dinwiddie Middle School is the middle school. Their mascot is the Generals. Other schools in the county include Dinwiddie Elementary School, Midway Elementary, Sutherland Elementary, Sunnyside Elementary, and Southside Elementary, as well as Historic Southside High School Education Center.
