= Ferdinand F. Rohm =

German-American soldier and bugler

Ferdinand Frederick Rohm
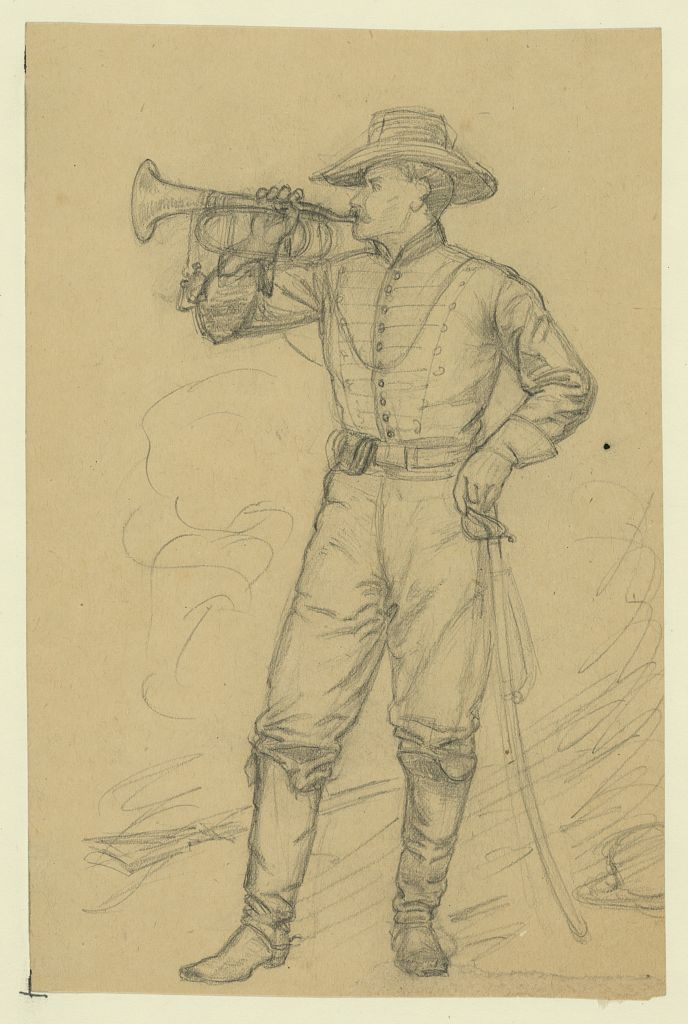
- Alfred Waud's sketch of an unidentified, Civil War-era bugler, c. 1861–1865
- Born: August 30, 1843; Esslingen, Landkreis Esslingen, Kingdom of Württemberg
- Died: November 24, 1917 (aged 74); Harrisburg, Pennsylvania
- Military career
- Allegiance: United States of America
- Branch: United States Army (Union Army)
- Rank: Chief bugler
- Unit: 16th Pennsylvania Cavalry
- Conflicts: American Civil War: Battle of Kelly's Ford; Chancellorsville Campaign; Stoneman's 1863 raid; Gettysburg campaign; Battle of Brandy Station; Battle of Aldie; Battle of Middleburg; Battle of Gettysburg; Battle of Culpeper Court House; Bristoe Campaign; First Battle of Auburn; Battle of Bristoe Station; Mine Run Campaign; Overland Campaign; Battle of the Wilderness; Battle of Yellow Tavern; Battle of Totopotomoy Creek; Battle of Haw's Shop; Battle of Cold Harbor; Battle of Trevilian Station; Battle of Saint Mary's Church; Siege of Petersburg; First Battle of Deep Bottom; Second Battle of Deep Bottom; Second Battle of Ream's Station; Battle of Boydton Plank Road; Battle of Poplar Springs Church; Battle of Hatcher's Run; Appomattox Campaign; Battle of Dinwiddie Court House; Battle of Five Forks; Battle of Amelia Springs; Battle of Sailor's Creek
- Awards: Medal of Honor

Ferdinand Frederick Rohm (August 30, 1843 – November 24, 1917) was a native of the German Kingdom of Württemberg who fought for the federal government of the United States during the American Civil War. He was awarded America's highest honor for valor, the U.S. Medal of Honor, for his gallantry while fighting with the Union Army as the chief bugler for the 16th Pennsylvania Cavalry during the Second Battle of Ream's Station, Virginia on August 25, 1864. As his regiment retreated under heavy enemy fire that day, he "remained behind to succor a wounded officer who was in great danger, secured assistance, and removed the officer to a place of safety." Rohm was then also severely wounded in action less than a year later as his regiment fought at Farmville, Virginia on April 7, 1865 during the war-ending Appomattox Campaign.

== Formative years ==
Born on August 30, 1843, Ferdinand Frederick Rohm was a native of Esslingen in the Kingdom of Württemberg.

== Civil War ==
On September 1, 1862, at the age of 19, Ferdinand F. Rohm enrolled for Civil War military service in Juniata County, Pennsylvania. He then officially mustered in for duty at Camp Curtin in Harrisburg on September 18 as a private with Company F of the 16th Pennsylvania Cavalry.

Transported south by rail and then marched to the vicinity of Falmouth, Virginia in early January 1863, and then assigned to operations along the Rappahannock River, Rohm was transferred from Company F to the central command of the 16th Pennsylvania Cavalry, and promoted to the rank of chief bugler on February 1, 1863, Engaged with his regiment in Union cavalry operations at the Rappahannock Bridge and Grove Church (February 5–7) and Hartwood Church (February 25), Rohm then helped to call and direct his fellow 16th Pennsylvania Cavalrymen in combat in the Battle of Kelly's Ford (March 17); operations near Bealeton Station (April 13–27) and Elk Run (April 13); the Chancellorsville Campaign (April 26 – May 8), including Stoneman's 1863 Raid (April 13 – May 10) and actions at Kelly's Ford (April 29) and Ely's Ford (May 2); the Gettysburg campaign (June 3 – July 24), including the battles of Brandy Station (June 9), Aldie (June 17), Middleburg (June 18–19), and Gettysburg (July 1– 3), as well as operations at Steven's Furnace (July 5) and Shepherdstown, West Virginia (July 14–16); the Union's advance to the Rapidan (September 13–17), which included the Battle of Culpeper Court House (September 13); the Bristoe Campaign (October 9–22), which included the First Battle of Auburn (October 13) and the Battle of Bristoe Station (October 14); and the Mine Run Campaign (November 26 – December 2).

Engaged with his regiment in Kilpatrick's Raid on Richmond from February 28 through March 4, 1864, Rohm continued to help call and direct his fellow 16th Pennsylvania Cavalrymen in battle as chief bugler for his regiment during the Battle of the Wilderness (May 5–8) as part of Union Lt. General Ulysses S. Grant's Overland Campaign, and during Major-General Philip H. Sheridan's raids along the James River (May 9–14), including the battles of Yellow Tavern (May 11) and Totopotomoy Creek (May 2 –31). Continuing to fight with his regiment during Grant's Overland Campaign in the Battle of Haw's Shop (May 28), Rohm then also called the 16th Pennsylvania to battle at Cold Harbor (May 31 – June 1), Trevilian Station (June 11–12) and Saint Mary's Church (June 24).

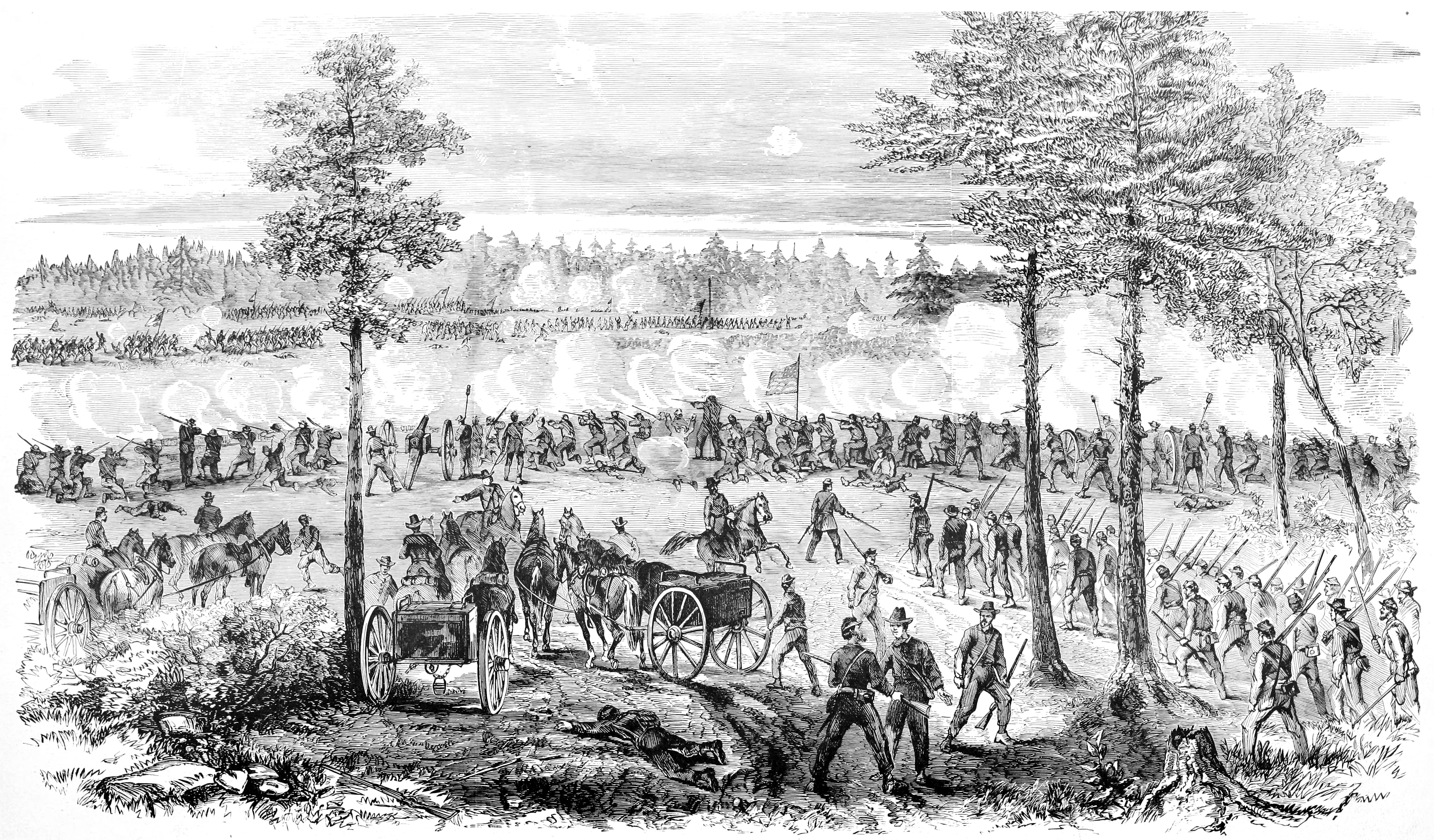
Repulse of the final Confederate assault, Second Battle of Ream's Station, Virginia, August 25, 1864 (Frank Leslie's Illustrated Newspaper).

Next engaged with his regiment during the Siege of Petersburg from July 1864 to April 1865, Rohm bugled the 16th Pennsylvania Cavalry into fighting positions during the First and Second Battles of Deep Bottom (July 27–29 and August 14–20). On August 25, 1864, he then performed the act of valor for which he would later be awarded the U.S. Medal of Honor. While serving as the chief bugler for the 16th Pennsylvania Cavalry during the Second Battle of Ream's Station, Virginia on August 25, 1864, he "remained behind to succor a wounded officer, (Colonel James Addams Beaver of the 148th Pennsylvania Infantry), who was in great danger, secured assistance, and removed the officer to a place of safety" as his regiment retreated under heavy enemy fire. Interviewed later in life about his actions that day, Rohm recalled:

The evening before the battle we had quite a conflict with Gen. Hill's corps, which was massing in front of us. We kept a sharp lookout, expecting a hot fight the next day. And sure enough, our expectations were realized. The following morning, after a great deal of maneuvering and picketing, the enemy attacked us with a regiment of cavalry. We were apprised of the attack in advance by our pickets and by forming quickly we were able to repulse them. The [officer] who led the charge was killed and his men driven back into the lines. Directly after their retreat a heavy skirmish line of the rebels appeared. It was followed by a line of battle which opened fire on us. We suffered considerably from their fire and fell back toward our infantry. Just after we had passed a small piece of woods about 10 yards from our line of entrenchments I noticed a field officer lying on his back in the dust in the middle of the road, waving his hand toward us. My attention was particularly attracted to him by the fine, new dress uniform and the shoulder straps of a colonel which he wore. As I drew nearer I saw he was wounded. I knew if we did not take him along he would be captured by the enemy or killed. I jumped on my horse and upon examination saw he was shot through the thigh. I had three of our pioneers dismount and assist.

Afterward, Rohm and his regiment continued to fight on – in the battles of Poplar Springs Church (September 29 – October 2), Boydton Plank Road (October 27–28), and Hatcher's Run (February 5–7) before engaging in the war-ending Appomattox Campaign (March 28 – April 9), which included the battles of Dinwiddie Court House (March 30–31), Five Forks (April 1), Amelia Springs (April 5), and Sailor's Creek (April 6).

The next day, both Rohm and his commanding officer, Colonel John Robinson, were severely wounded in action. According to Jari Villanueva, Non-Commissioned Officer In Charge, U.S Air Force Band and ceremonial trumpeter, Arlington National Cemetery (retired), and the artistic director of the National Association for Civil War Brass Music, Inc., Rohm, as the regimental bugler, had been by Robinson's side throughout numerous battles and had developed a close, working relationship with his superior. On April 7, 1865, as the duo led the 16th Pennsylvania Cavalry in a sabre charge against near Farmville, Virginia, both were felled — Rohm by a minie ball which struck the left side of his head.

Successfully treated for his battle wounds, but now deaf in his left ear, according to the 1890 U.S. Census of Union Veterans and Widows of the Civil War, Rohm was honorably discharged on a surgeon's certificate of disability on June 15, 1865, and sent home to Pennsylvania.

== Post-war life ==
Following his honorable discharge from the military, Rohm wed Mary Lindsay (1840–1930), a native of Ireland, who was a daughter of Edward Lindsay (1802–1867) and Mary (Armstrong) Lindsay (1806–1889). He and his wife then began to build a life with the births of their children Pauline (1870–1959); Edward, Frederick and Mary (born circa 1872, 1873 and 1876); Nancy L. (1877–1946); William (born circa 1879); and Dorothy (1883–1957) at their home in Juniata County on what had been the property of Dennis Christie during the mid-1700s (and later that of J. Shelburn Robinson).

Appointed to the park police at the Pennsylvania's State Arsenal in 1887 by Pennsylvania Governor James Addams Beaver, the Union officer whose life he had saved at Ream's Station nearly a quarter of a century earlier, Rohm continued his employment with the Commonwealth of Pennsylvania's Public Grounds and Buildings department as a watchman into the 1890s and early 1900s. In 1912, Rohm was promoted to the rank of sergeant with the Capitol Police.

== Death and interment ==
On Monday morning, November 18, 1917, Rohm "stricken with apoplexy … while talking to another Capitol guard in the rotunda of the Capitol" after having "just returned from the Governor's office where he had formally filed an application for retirement under the State pension act which provides half salary for men who have served the Commonwealth for thirty years or more", according to newspaper accounts of the incident. The Harrisburg Telegraph reported that:

Frederick F. Rohm, of Patterson, Juniata county, sergeant of the State Capitol Police, and known to many men in public life in Pennsylvania, was stricken with paralysis while on duty in the Rotunda of the State Capitol to-day and was taken to the Harrisburg Hospital in a serious condition. Mr. Rohm, who is seventy-four, had just finished preparation of papers to be submitted to the Governor for retirement under the act providing for pensioning of state employees who have passed the age of seventy and have been in state service over twenty years. Mr. Rohm was a member of the First Pennsylvania or Juniata Cavalry in the Civil War and received a Congressional medal of honor. He carried the late Governor James A. Beaver from the battlefield at Brandy Station [sic] when the future governor was desperately wounded. He has been connected with the Capitol Police for years and has been sergeant for the last five.

Transferred to Harrisburg's Polyclinic Hospital sometime thereafter, he died there on November 24, 1917, and was buried at the Westminster Presbyterian Cemetery in Mifflintown, Juniata County.

== Medal of Honor citation ==
Rank and Organization: Chief Bugler, 16th Pennsylvania Cavalry. Place and Date: At Ream's Station, Va., August 25, 1864. Entered Service at: Juniata County, Pa. Date of Issue: October 16, 1897. Citation:

The President of the United States of America, in the name of Congress, takes pleasure in presenting the Medal of Honor to Chief Bugler Ferdinand Frederick Rohm, United States Army, for extraordinary heroism on August 25, 1864, while serving with 16th Pennsylvania Cavalry, in action at Reams' Station, Virginia. While his regiment was retiring under fire, Chief Bugler Rohm voluntarily remained behind to succor a wounded officer who was in great danger, secured assistance, and removed the officer to a place of safety.

== See also ==
- List of American Civil War Medal of Honor recipients: Q–S
- Pennsylvania in the American Civil War
