= 1st Pennsylvania Cavalry Regiment =

Union Army cavalry regiment

1st Pennsylvania Cavalry
- Active: July 1861 to June 17, 1865
- Country: United States
- Allegiance: Union
- Branch: Cavalry
- Engagements: Battle of Dranesville; Battle of Cross Keys; Battle of Brandy Station; Battle of Cedar Mountain; Second Battle of Bull Run; Battle of Antietam; Battle of Fredericksburg; Stoneman's 1863 Raid; Battle of Chancellorsville (Company H); Battle of Gettysburg; Bristoe Campaign; Battle of Bristoe Station; Mine Run Campaign; Overland Campaign; Battle of Haw's Shop; Battle of Cold Harbor; Battle of Trevilian Station; Siege of Petersburg; First Battle of Deep Bottom; Battle of Hatcher's Run; Appomattox Campaign; Battle of Five Forks; Battle of Amelia Springs; Battle of Sailor's Creek; Battle of Appomattox Court House

The 1st Pennsylvania Cavalry (14th Reserves / 44th Volunteers) was a cavalry regiment that served in the Union Army as part of the Pennsylvania Reserves infantry division during the American Civil War.

== Service ==
The 1st Pennsylvania Cavalry (Companies A through G) was organized at Camp Curtin in Harrisburg, Pennsylvania as the "44th Volunteers" and mustered in for state service in July and August 1861 under the command of Colonel George Dashiell Bayard.

Companies H, I, and K were organized at Camp Wilkins in Pittsburgh, August 1861. Company L was organized as an independent company on July 30, 1861, and served duty at Baltimore until January 7, 1862, when it joined the regiment. Company M was organized as an independent company August 5, 1861. At Baltimore until October 3, 1861, then on the eastern shore of Maryland under Lockwood picketing and scouting until January 7, 1862, when it joined the regiment.

The regiment was attached to McCall's Division, Army of the Potomac, to March 1862. Cavalry, McDowell's I Corps, Army of the Potomac, to April 1862. Bayard's Cavalry Brigade, Department of the Rappahannock, to June 1862. Bayard's Cavalry Brigade, III Corps, Army of Virginia, to September 1862. Bayard's Brigade, Cavalry Division, Army of the Potomac, to January 1863. 2nd Brigade, 3rd Division, Cavalry Corps, Army of the Potomac, to June 1863. 1st Brigade, 2nd Division, Cavalry Corps, Army of the Potomac, to June 1865.

The 1st Pennsylvania Cavalry ceased to exist on June 17, 1865, when it was consolidated with the 6th Pennsylvania Cavalry and 17th Pennsylvania Cavalry to form the 2nd Regiment Pennsylvania Provisional Cavalry.

== Detailed service ==
- Moved to Camp Jones, near Washington, D.C., August.
- Reconnaissance to Leesburg, Virginia, October 20, 1861. Reconnaissance to Hunter's Mills October 20 (detachment).
- Expedition to Dranesville November 26–27. Action at Dranesville November 27. Expedition to Gunnell's Farm December 6.
- Battle of Dranesville December 20 (Companies C, D, E, H, and I).
- At Camp Pierpont until March 1862. Advance on Manassas, Va., March 10–15. McDowell's advance to Falmouth April 9–17.
- Reconnaissance to Falmouth April 17–19. Falmouth April 19. Rappahannock River May 13 (Companies F, G, H, L, and M).
- Strasburg and Staunton Road June 1–2. Mount Jackson June 3. New Market June 5. Harrisonburg June 6. Battle of Cross Keys June 8. Harrisonburg June 9. Scouting on the Rappahannock June–July. Reconnaissance to James City July 22–24.
- Skirmish at Madison Court House July 23. Slaughter House August 8. Battle of Cedar Mountain August 9. Pope's Campaign in northern Virginia August 16-September 2. Stevensburg, Raccoon Ford, and Brandy Station August 20.
- Fords of the Rappahannock August 21–23. Special duty at General Pope's Headquarters August 22–30. Thoroughfare Gap August 28 (Companies I and M). Gainesville August 28.
- Second Battle of Bull Run August 29–30. Germantown August 31. Centreville and Chantilly August 31. Chantilly September 1. Fairfax Court House September 2.
- Battle of Antietam September 16–17.
- Scout to Warrenton September 29. Aldie and Mountsville October 31.
- Salem, New Baltimore, and Thoroughfare Gap November 4. Warrenton November 6. Rappahannock Station November 7, 8 and 9.
- Battle of Fredericksburg December 12–15.
- Picket near King George Court House until January 1863. "Mud March" January 20–24. (Company H at Headquarters of VI Corps February 22 to August 15.)
- Picket duty from Falmouth to Port Conway until April 26.
- Chancellorsville Campaign April 26-May 8. Oak Grove April 26.
- Rapidan Station May 1. (Company H at Chancellorsville May 1–5.)
- Stoneman's Raid May 27-April 8.
- Brandy Station or Fleetwood and Beverly Ford June 9.
- Aldie June 17. Special duty at Corps Headquarters June 28.
- Battle of Gettysburg July 1–3.
- Emmettsburg, Md., July 4.
- Guarding Reserve Artillery July 5–10.
- Companies A and B advanced for VI Corps from Gettysburg to Hagerstown, Md., July 5–10. Old Antietam Forge, near Leitersburg, July 10.
- Near Harpers Ferry, W. Va., July 14. Shepherdstown July 15–16.
- Picket near Warrenton July–August. Rixeyville and Muddy Run August 5. Wilford's Ford August 9 (detachment).
- Carter's Run September 6.
- Scout to Middleburg September 10–11.
- Advance from the Rappahannock to the Rapidan September 13–17.
- Culpeper Court House September 13. Near Auburn October 1 (detachment). Bristoe Campaign October 9–22.
- Warrenton or White Sulphur Springs October 12–13.
- Auburn and Bristoe October 14. Brentsville October 14.
- Advance to line of the Rappahannock November 7–8.
- Rappahannock Bridge November 7–8. Mine Run Campaign November 26-December 2.
- New Hope Church November 27. Expedition to Turkey Run Station January 1–4, 1864.
- Scout to Piedmont February 17–18. Campaign from the Rapidan to the James May 4-June 12.
- Todd's Tavern May 5, 6, 7, and 8. Corbin's Bridge May 8. Sheridan's Raid May 9–24.
- New Castle and Davenport May 9. North Anna River May 9–10. Ashland May 11. Ground Squirrel Church and Yellow Tavern May 11. Brook's Church, Richmond Fortifications, May 12.
- Milford Station May 21.
- On line of the Pamunkey May 26–28.
- Haw's Shop May 28. Totopotomoy May 28–31.
- Cold Harbor May 28–31.
- Sumner's Upper Bridge June 2. Sheridan's Trevilian Raid June 7–24.
- Trevilian Station June 11–12.
- Newark or Mallory's Cross Roads June 12.
- White House or St. Peter's Church June 21.
- Black Creek or Tunstall's Station June 21. St. Mary's Church June 24.
- Hope Church June 24.
- Bellefield July.
- Warwick Swamp July 12.
- Demonstration north of the James July 27–29.
- Malvern Hill and Gaines Hill July 28.
- Lee's Mills July 30. Demonstration north of James River August 13–20.
- Gravel Hill August 14.
- Malvern Hill August 16.
- Strawberry Plains August 16–18.
- Dinwiddie Road, near Ream's Station, August 23.
- Ream's Station August 25.
- Old members mustered out September 9.
- Consolidated to a battalion of five companies September 9.
- Belcher's Mills September 17.
- Poplar Springs Church September 29-October 2.
- Arthur's Swamp September 30-October 1.
- Charles City Cross Roads October 1.
- Hatcher's Run October 27–28.
- Reconnaissance toward Stony Creek November 7.
- Stony Creek Station December 1.
- Hicksford Raid December 7–12.
- Bellefield December 9–10.
- Dabney's Mills, Hatcher's Run, February 5–7, 1865.
- Appomattox Campaign March 28-April 9.
- Dinwiddie Court House March 30–31.
- Five Forks April 1.
- Amelia Springs April 5.
- Sailor's Creek April 6.
- Farmville April 7.
- Appomattox Court House April 9.
- Surrender of Lee and his army.
- Expedition to Danville April 23–29. Moved to Washington, D.C.. Grand Review of the Armies May 23.

== Casualties ==
The regiment lost a total of 201 men during service; 9 officers and 87 enlisted men killed or mortally wounded, 1 officer and 104 enlisted men died of disease.

== Commanders ==
- Colonel George Dashiell Bayard - promoted to brigadier general May 5, 1862 and killed in action at the Battle of Fredericksburg
- Colonel Owen Jones - resigned January 30, 1863
- Colonel John P. Taylor
- Lieutenant Colonel David Gardner - commanded during the Bristoe and Mine Run campaigns
- Lieutenant Colonel Jacob C. Higgins - commanded at the Battle of Dranesville
- Major Hampton Sidney Thomas - commanded during the Appomattox Campaign

== Notable members ==
- Sergeant John A. Davidsizer, Company A - Medal of Honor recipient for action at the Battle of Amelia Springs
- Sergeant Alexander Elliott, Company A - Medal of Honor recipient for action at the Battle of Amelia Springs
- Private Charles Higby, Company F - Medal of Honor recipient for action during the Appomattox Campaign
- Bugler James Parker Landis - Medal of Honor recipient for action at the Battle of Amelia Springs
- Major Hampton Sidney Thomas - Medal of Honor recipient for action at the Battle of Amelia Springs
- Sergeant Andrew J. Young, Company F - Medal of Honor recipient for action at the Battle of Amelia Springs

== Monuments and memorials ==
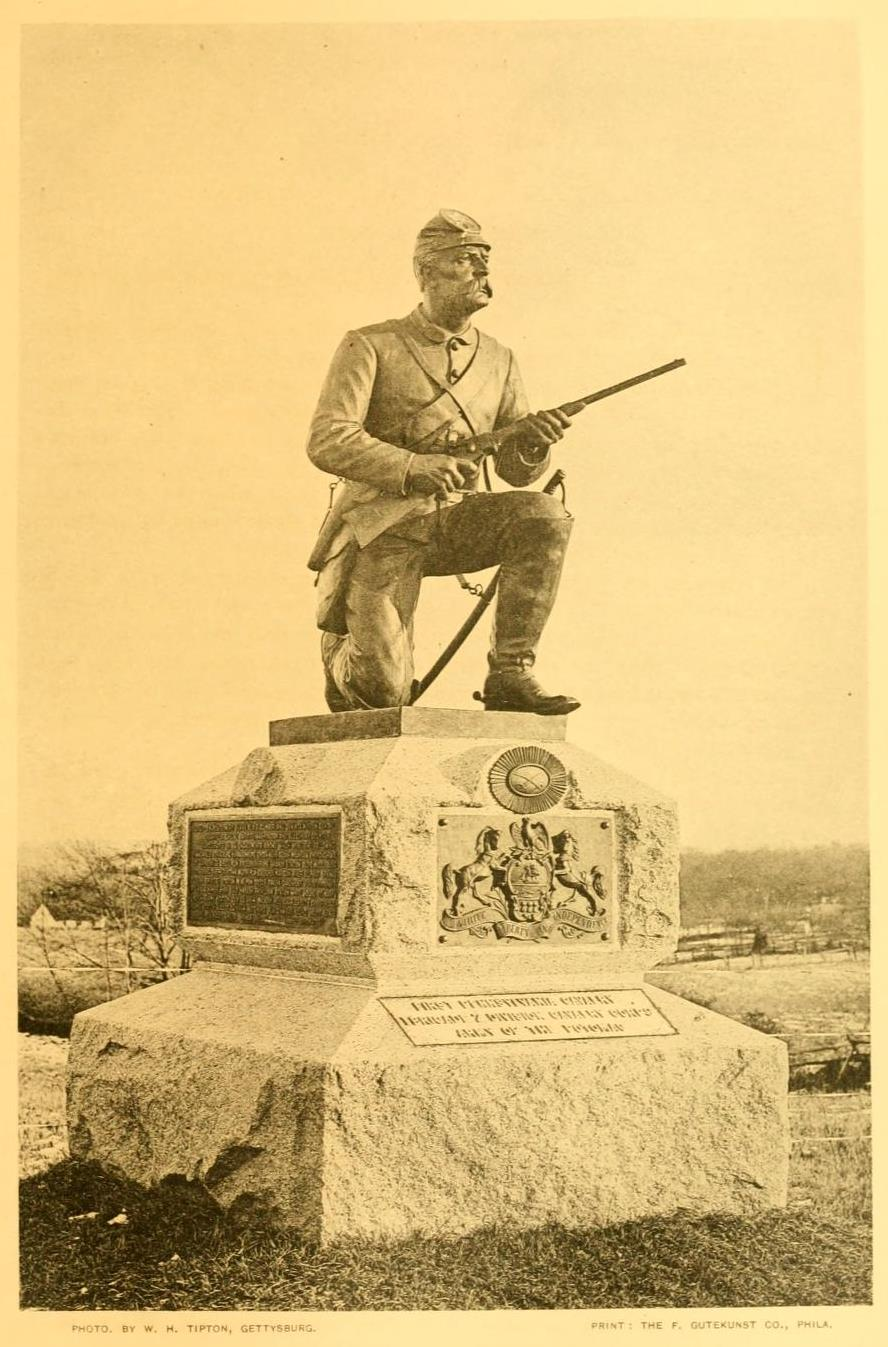
1st Pennsylvania Cavalry Monument, Gettysburg Battlefield.

Among the tributes paid to the regiment, during and after the Civil War, were the Congressional Medal of Honor awards conferred upon members of the regiment for valor and the placement of the 1st Pennsylvania Cavalry monument on the battlefield at the Gettysburg National Park.

== See also ==
- List of Pennsylvania Civil War regiments
- Pennsylvania in the American Civil War
