= Andrew J. Young (Medal of Honor) =

Union Army soldier (1837–1910)

Andrew Jackson Young
- Born: December 28, 1837; Morgan Township, Greene County, Pennsylvania, US
- Died: January 27, 1910 (aged 72); Jefferson, Pennsylvania, US
- Burial place: Jefferson Cemetery, Jefferson, Greene County, Pennsylvania, US
- Military career
- Allegiance: United States
- Branch: United States Army (Union Army)
- Rank: Sergeant
- Units: Company F, 1st Pennsylvania Cavalry (44th Pennsylvania Volunteers)
- Conflicts: American Civil War: Battle of Cross Keys; Battle of Brandy Station; Battle of Cedar Mountain; Second Battle of Bull Run; Battle of Antietam; Battle of Fredericksburg; Stoneman's 1863 Raid; Battle of Gettysburg; Bristoe Campaign; Battle of Bristoe Station; Mine Run Campaign; Overland Campaign; Battle of Haw's Shop; Battle of Cold Harbor; Battle of Trevilian Station; Siege of Petersburg; First Battle of Deep Bottom; Appomattox Campaign; Battle of Amelia Springs/Paines Crossroads
- Awards: Medal of Honor

Andrew Jackson Young (December 28, 1837 – January 27, 1910) was a United States soldier who fought with the Union Army during the American Civil War as a member of Company F of the 1st Pennsylvania Cavalry (also known as the 44th Pennsylvania Volunteers). He received his nation's highest award for valor, the U.S. Medal of Honor, for capturing a Confederate flag at Paines Crossroads, Virginia, on April 5, 1865. That award was conferred on May 3, 1865.

== Formative years ==
Born in Morgan Township, Pennsylvania, Andrew Jackson Young was a son of Christopher and Rachel Young (c. 1803 – 1880). He and his siblings, Permelia (1825-1890), Mary (born c. 1829), James (born c. 1831), Elizabeth Jane (1834-1878), Rachel C. (1841-1918), and John (born c. 1843) were reared and educated in Greene County.

== Civil War ==
During the summer of 1861, Young became one of Pennsylvania's early responders to President Abraham Lincoln's call for volunteers to defend Washington, D.C. following the mid-April 1861 fall of Fort Sumter to Confederate States Army troops. After enrolling for Civil War military service in Greene County, Pennsylvania on August 15, he then officially mustered in for duty at Camp Curtin in Harrisburg on August 24 as a private with Company F of the 1st Pennsylvania Cavalry (also known as the 44th Pennsylvania Volunteers). Military records at the time described him as being a 28-year-old farmer and resident of Brown Township in Mifflin County, Pennsylvania, who was 5'11" tall with light hair, light eyes and a light complexion. At least one of his records noted that his first name was "Anderson".

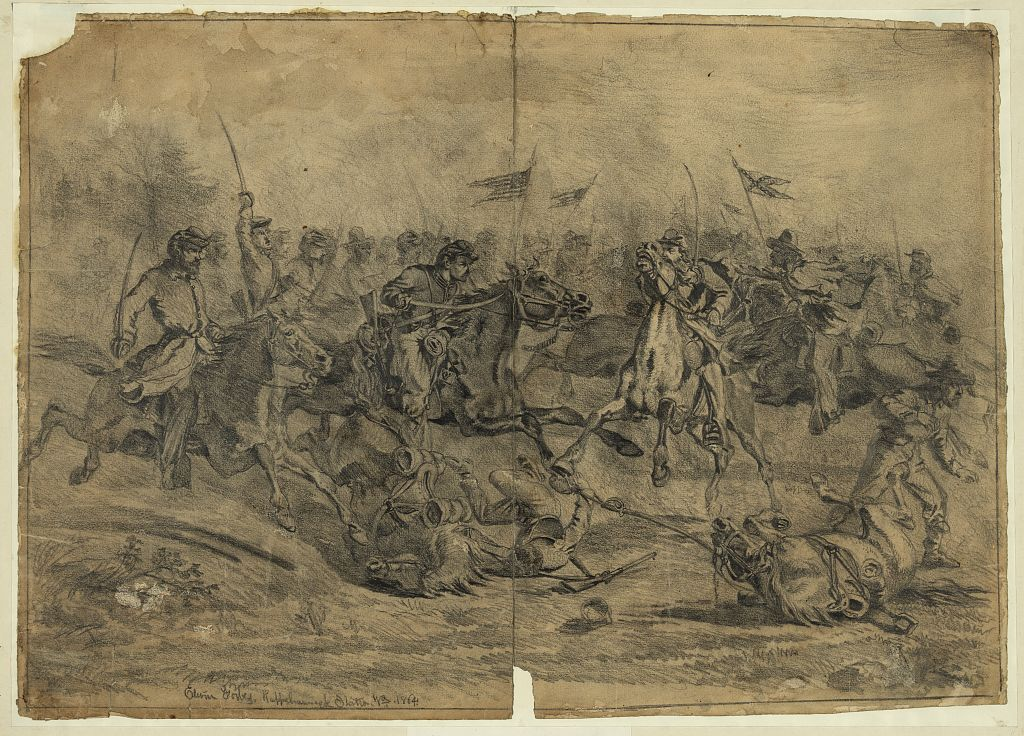
Edwin Forbes' illustration of a cavalry charge near Brandy Station, Virginia on June 9, 1863.

Transported with his regiment to Camp Jones near Washington, D.C., in August 1861, Young and his fellow 1st Pennsylvania Cavalrymen were assigned to defensive duties there. Attached with his regiment to the Union's Army of the Potomac through April 1862 (McCall's Division through March and McDowell's I Corps through April), he and his regiment's first major engagement came in the Expedition to Dranesville beginning in late November 1861. He was then stationed with the 1st Pennsylvania Cavalry at Camp Pierpont through March 1862. Participating with his regiment in the Advance on Manassas from March 10 to 15, he then engaged in McDowell's operations in and around Falmouth from April 9 to 19 of that year. Reassigned with his regiment to Bayard's Cavalry Brigade, which was attached to the Department of the Rappahannock (until June 1862), the Army of Virginia's III Corps (to September 1862) and the Army of the Potomac to June 1863, he fought with his regiment in the battles of Cross Keys, Virginia (June 8, 1862) and Cedar Mountain (August 9); Second Battle of Bull Run (August 28–30); battles of Antietam (September 17) and Fredericksburg (August 12–15); Stoneman's 1863 Raid (April 13 to May 10, 1863); and the Battle of Brandy Station (June 9). According to historian Samuel P. Bates:

Moving to Kelly's Ford, [the Union Army] crossed on the 9th of June, and was immediately engaged in the battle of Brandy Station.... At two P.M. the First and Fourth Divisions, under Buford, moved to Beverly Ford, and the Second and Third, under Gregg, to Kelly's Ford, where they bivouacked for the night. Crossing the river early on the following morning, Gregg moved out four miles to Stevensburg, where he left Colonel Duffy with the Second Division, to protect his flank, and proceeded with the Third Division to Brandy Station. The Second Brigade, composed of the First Pennsylvania, First New Jersey, and the First Maryland, under the command of Colonel Wyndham, took the advance.... On arriving at Brandy Station, the enemy opened with his artillery, which was promptly answered, and the first Maryland ... charged [while] Colonel Taylor led a desperate charge upon the left and rear of the foe, reaching the Barbour House, where were General Stuart, his staff, and body guard, surrounded by cavalry. Here a desperate encounter ensued, the men using the cavalrymen's true weapon, the sabre, with terrible effect. A number of prisoners were brought off.... At this point the enemy was heavily reinforced, and the command was obliged to withdraw.... The enemy failing to attack, Gregg moved toward Rappahannock Station, where he was again engaged, the First Pennsylvania supporting a battery. An artillery duel was kept up for nearly two hours, when Colonel Taylor was ordered to report, with his command, to General Buford, at Beverly Ford. Upon its arrival it was ordered to the extreme right, where it was hotly engaged.... The loss in this engagement was three killed and eleven severely wounded.

Marching two days later across the former battlefield of Bull Run, his regiment clashed again with Confederates — this time at Aldie on June 22. Assigned to guard the rear of the Union Army as it marched for Pennsylvania, the 1st Pennsylvania Cavalrymen reached the battlefield at Gettysburg during the morning of July 2, and were immediately assigned to duties at the headquarters of General George Meade for the remainder of the engagement before guarding the Union's reserve artillery as it made its way back from Pennsylvania into Maryland beginning July 5, 1863. Rejoining their brigade by mid-month, they next engaged the enemy near Shepardstown before withdrawing to Bolivar Heights. Encamped near Warrenton beginning July 27, they were assigned to guard, picket and scouting duties through mid-September when they joined other Union forces in re-engaging intensely with the enemy for three hours from Muddy Run to Culpepper on September 13, after which the 1st Pennsylvanians were sent out on skirmish assignments. Their next major engagements came in the Bristoe Campaign from October through November 1863, including the Battle of Bristoe Station (October 14), and the Mine Run Campaign in late November and early December.

Having been promoted to the rank of corporal sometime earlier in his service tenure, Young re-enlisted for another tour of duty on February 4, 1864, while his regiment was stationed at Warrenton, Virginia. Next assigned to the Overland Campaign led by Union General Ulysses S. Grant, Young and his fellow 1st Pennsylvania Cavalrymen fought in the battles of Haw's Shop (May 28), Cold Harbor (May 13 to June 12) and Trevilian Station (June 11–12) before engaging in the Siege of Petersburg through March 1865, which included the battles of First Battle of Deep Bottom/Gravel Hill (July 27–29, 1864). It was sometime during this phase of service that Young was promoted to the rank of sergeant before being transferred to the 1st Pennsylvania Battery (on September 4, 1864).

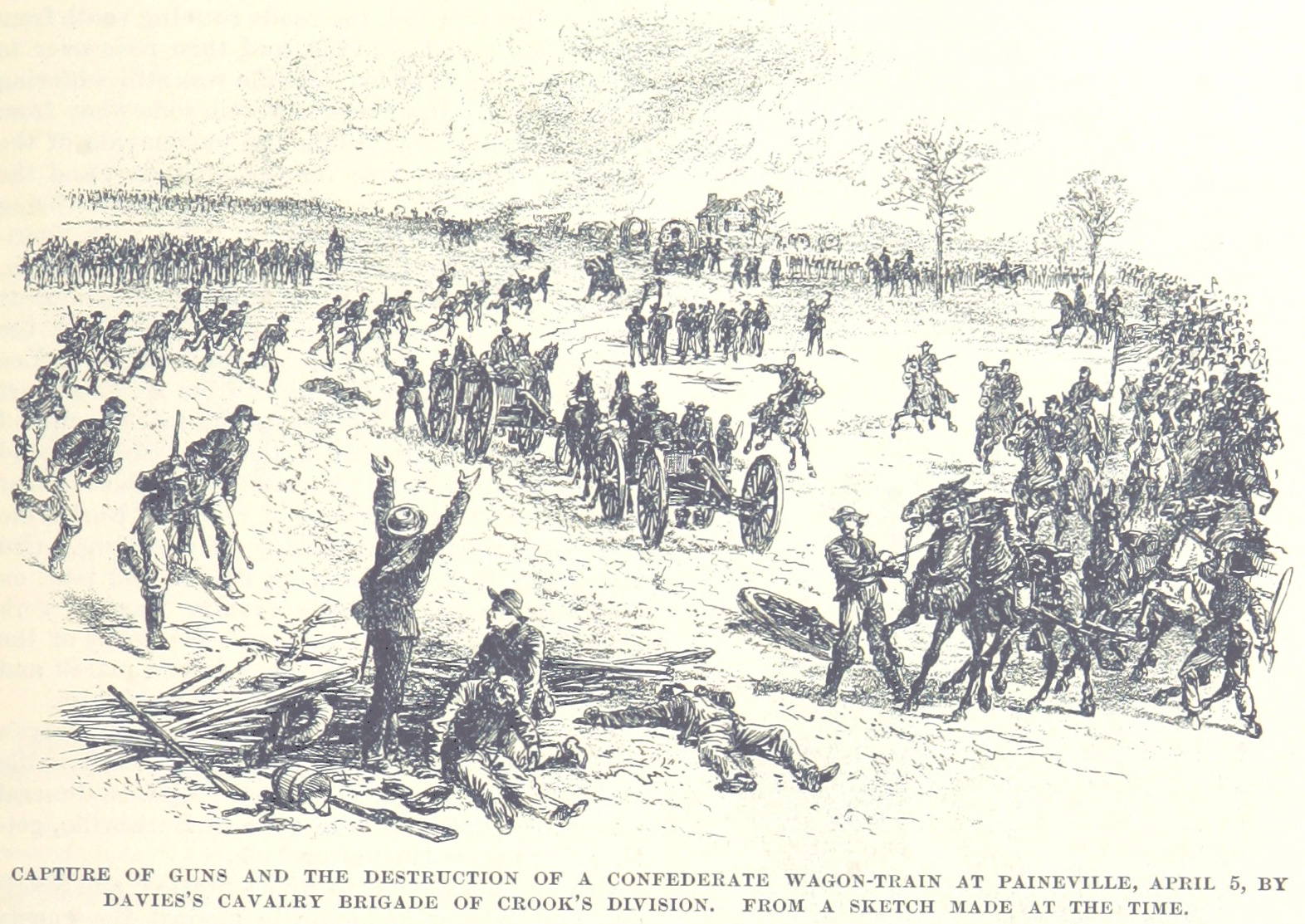
Alfred Waud's illustration of the Union cavalry's destruction of a Confederate wagon train near Paineville, Virginia on April 5, 1865.

Assigned with his regiment to the war-ending Appomattox Campaign during the spring of 1865, Young then performed the act of gallantry for which he would later be awarded the U.S. Medal of Honor — capturing the enemy's flag at Paines Crossroads while fighting with the 1st Pennsylvania in the Battle of Amelia Springs, Virginia on April 5. He was then honorably discharged on June 17, 1865, by Special Order No. 312, under the provisions of General Order No. 83 (dated May 8, 1865).

== Post-war life ==
Following his honorable discharge from the military, Young returned home to Greene County where, in 1865, he married and began his own family. He and his wife, Minerva, a fellow native of Pennsylvania (born June 29, 1842), welcomed the births of their daughter, Millie, in July 1867, and their son, John, in November 1870. A farmer in 1880, Young resided with his wife and two children in Greene County's borough of Jefferson. According to historian William Hanna, the Young's home was situated on "the identical place where the old stockade was erected about the year 1770." According to Bates, that former stockade was known as "Fort Swan and Vanmeter," and it was located "near the border of Cumberland Township" at "a noted rallying point ... for the venturesome pioneers and their families." Young's home in the 1880s, per Bates, had been built on the same grounds where the home of his wife's great-grandfather had stood during the early 1770s. Historian Thomas Lynch Montgomery narrowed down the location of Swan's home at the fort further in 1916, stating that it had been situated "near the present town of Carmichaels."

Suffering from rheumatism by 1890, he was awarded a U.S. Civil War Pension in 1897. By 1900, he had moved with his wife and children into the Jefferson home of his mother-in-law, Sarah Neel. Employed as a U.S. Postmaster that year, his daughter, Millie, was employed as the Assistant U.S. Postmaster while his son, John, worked as a farmer.

== Death and interment ==
Young died in Jefferson, Pennsylvania, on January 27, 1910, and was buried at the Jefferson Cemetery in Greene County.

== Medal of Honor citation ==
Rank and organization: Sergeant, Company F, 1st Pennsylvania Cavalry. Place and date: At Paines Crossroads, Va., April 5, 1865. Entered service at: Carmichaelstown, Pa. Date of issue: May 3, 1865. Citation:

The President of the United States of America, in the name of Congress, takes pleasure in presenting the Medal of Honor to Sergeant Andrew J. Young, United States Army, for extraordinary heroism on April 5, 1865, while serving with Company F, 1st Pennsylvania Cavalry, in action at Paines Crossroads, Virginia, for capture of flag.

== See also ==
- Cavalry in the American Civil War
- List of American Civil War Medal of Honor recipients: T–Z
- Pennsylvania in the American Civil War
