= James P. Landis =

American Civil War Medal of Honor recipient

James Parker Landis
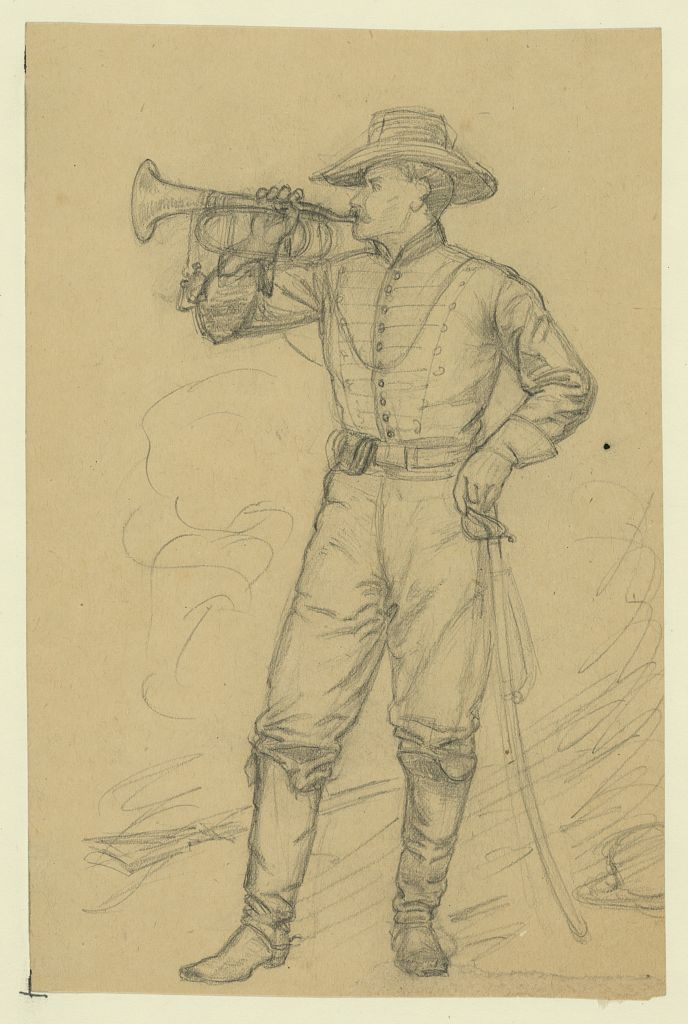
- Alfred Waud's sketch of an unidentified, Civil War-era bugler, c. 1861-1865
- Born: July 20, 1843; Mifflin County, Pennsylvania, US
- Died: December 1, 1924 (aged 81); Derry Township, Mifflin County, Pennsylvania, US
- Burial place: Yeagertown Cemetery, Yeagertown, Pennsylvania
- Military career
- Branch: United States Army (Union Army)
- Service years: 1861-1865
- Rank: Chief Bugler
- Unit: 1st Pennsylvania Cavalry Regiment (15th Reserves/44th Pennsylvania Volunteers)
- Conflicts: American Civil War: Dranesville Operations (December 20, 1861); Battle of Cross Keys; Battle of Cedar Mountain; Second Battle of Bull Run; Battle of Antietam; Battle of Fredericksburg; Stoneman's 1863 Raid; Battle of Gettysburg; Bristoe Campaign; Battle of Bristoe Station; Mine Run Campaign; Overland Campaign; Battle of Haw's Shop; Battle of Cold Harbor; Battle of Trevilian Station; Siege of Petersburg; First Battle of Deep Bottom; Battle of Hatcher's Run; Appomattox Campaign; Battle of Five Forks; Battle of Amelia Springs; Battle of Sailor's Creek; Battle of Appomattox Court House
- Awards: Medal of Honor

James Parker Landis (July 20, 1843 – December 1, 1924) was an American soldier who served in the Union Army during the American Civil War. He received the Medal of Honor for the capture of a Confederate flag during the Battle of Amelia Springs while serving as the Chief Bugler of the 1st Pennsylvania Cavalry.

== Early life ==
James Parker Landis was born and raised in Mifflin County, Pennsylvania on July 20, 1843, to Martin and Mary Landis. By 1860 he resided in the community of Lewistown in Derry Township with his parents and older brother Joseph, who served as an apprentice plasterer to his father Martin, a master plasterer.

== Civil War ==
Landis enlisted into the Union Army on August 18, 1861 from Lewistown, Pennsylvania. He then officially mustered for duty in Washington, D.C. on August 27, 1861 as a sergeant and bugler with Company C of the 1st Pennsylvania Cavalry (also known as the 44th Pennsylvania Volunteers). Military records at the time described him as being an 18-year-old plasterer from Mifflin County who was 5' 9-1/2" tall with black hair, black eyes and a dark complexion.

Transported with his regiment to Camp Jones near Washington, D.C. in August 1861, he and the 1st Pennsylvania Cavalrymen were assigned to defensive duties. Attached with his regiment to the Union's Army of the Potomac through April 1862 (McCall's Division through March and McDowell's I Corps through April), his regiment's first major engagement came in the expedition to Dranesville beginning in late November 1861. After seeing action with the men from his company (C) and those from companies D, E, H, and I at Dranesville on December 20, he was stationed with the 1st Pennsylvania Cavalry at Camp Pierpont through March 1862. Participating with his regiment in an advance on Manassas from March 10 to 15, he then engaged in McDowell's operations in and around Falmouth from April 9 to 19 of that year. Reassigned with his regiment to Bayard's Cavalry Brigade, which was attached to the Department of the Rappahannock (until June 1862), the Army of Virginia's III Corps (to September 1862) and the Army of the Potomac to June 1863, he fought with his regiment in the battles of Cross Keys (June 8, 1862) and Cedar Mountain (August 9); Second Battle of Bull Run (August 28–30, 1862); battles of Antietam (September 17, 1862) and Fredericksburg (August 12–15, 1862); and Stoneman's 1863 Raid (April 13 to May 10, 1863).

During this latter phase of service, he was promoted from the rank of sergeant to Chief Bugler and transferred from C Company to his regiment's field and staff officers' corps on May 1, 1863. One month later, he was wounded while in service on June 9 in operations related to the Battle of Brandy Station. According to historian Samuel P. Bates:

"Moving to Kelly's Ford, [the Union Army] crossed on the 9th of June, and was immediately engaged in the battle of Brandy Station... At two P.M. the First and Fourth Divisions, under Buford, moved to Beverly Ford, and the Second and Third, under Gregg, to Kelly's Ford, where they bivouacked for the night. Crossing the river early on the following morning, Gregg moved out four miles to Stevensburg, where he left Colonel Duffy with the Second Division, to protect his flank, and proceeded with the Third Division to Brandy Station. The Second Brigade, composed of the First Pennsylvania, First New Jersey, and the First Maryland, under the command of Colonel Wyndham, took the advance.... On arriving at Brandy Station, the enemy opened with his artillery, which was promptly answered, and the first Maryland ... charged [while] Colonel Taylor led a desperate charge upon the left and rear of the foe, reaching the Barbour House, where were General Stuart, his staff, and bodyguard, surrounded by cavalry. Here a desperate encounter ensued, the men using the cavalrymen's true weapon, the saber, with terrible effect. A number of prisoners were brought off.... At this point the enemy was heavily reinforced, and the command was obliged to withdraw.... The enemy failing to attack, Gregg moved toward Rappahannock Station, where he was again engaged, the First Pennsylvania supporting a battery. An artillery duel was kept up for nearly two hours, when Colonel Taylor was ordered to report, with his command, to General Buford, at Beverly Ford. Upon its arrival it was ordered to the extreme right, where it was hotly engaged.... The loss in this engagement was three killed and eleven severely wounded."

Two days later when marching across the former battlefield of Bull Run, his regiment clashed again with Confederates — this time at Aldie on June 22. Assigned to guard the rear of the Union Army as it marched for Pennsylvania, the 1st Pennsylvania Cavalrymen reached the battlefield at Gettysburg during the morning of July 2, and were immediately assigned to duties at the headquarters of General George Meade for the remainder of the engagement before guarding the Union's reserve artillery as it made its way back from Pennsylvania into Maryland beginning July 5, 1863. Rejoining their brigade by mid-month, they next engaged the enemy near Shepardstown before withdrawing to Bolivar Heights. Encamped near Warrenton beginning July 27, they were assigned to guard, picket and scouting duties through mid-September when they joined other Union forces in re-engaging intensely with the enemy for three hours from Muddy Run to Culpepper on September 13, after which the 1st Pennsylvanians were sent out on skirmish assignments. Their next major engagements came in the Bristoe Campaign from October through November 1863, including the Battle of Bristoe Station (October 14), and the Mine Run Campaign in late November and early December.

Following the expiration of his initial term of service, he then re-enlisted on February 1, 1864, at Warrenton, Virginia. Next assigned to the Overland Campaign led by Union General Ulysses S. Grant, Landis and his fellow 1st Pennsylvania Cavalrymen fought in the battles of Haw's Shop (May 28), Cold Harbor (May 13 to June 12) and Trevilian Station (June 11–12) before engaging in the Siege of Petersburg through March 1865, which included the battles of First Battle of Deep Bottom/Gravel Hill (July 27–29, 1864). It was during this phase of service that Landis transferred to the 1st Pennsylvania Battery (on September 3, 1864).

After engaging with his regiment in the Battle of Five Forks on April 1, 1865, as part of the Appomattox Campaign, Landis then performed the act for which he would later be awarded the U.S. Medal of Honor — capturing the enemy's flag while fighting with the 1st Pennsylvania in the Battle of Amelia Springs, Virginia on April 5. That act and the subsequent transfer of his captured enemy prize were briefly described by U.S. Secretary of War William C. Endicott in his February 16, 1888 report to the U.S. House of Representatives regarding the whereabouts of "flags, standards, and colors captured of the enemies of the United States":

Captured in battle at Farm's Cross Roads, April 5, 1865, by Sergeant James P. Landis, chief bugler First Pennsylvania Cavalry. First Brigade, Second Cavalry Division, Brevet Major-General Davies, commanding. Loaned to Brevet Major-General Davies, May __, ____, by order of General Nichols, assistant adjutant-general.

Having survived the war through the surrender of the Confederate Army by General Robert E. Lee, Landis was finally discharged, honorably, by Special Order No. 312 on June 20, 1865.

== Post-war life ==
Following his honorable discharge from the military, Landis returned home to Mifflin County, where he resumed his work as a plasterer and married. In 1870, he resided in Lewistown, Derry Township with his wife, Annie (born in Pennsylvania, circa 1841).

Sometime around 1889, Landis married Caroline E. (Heckman) Landis (1845–1922), a daughter of Benjamin Heckman. In 1910, he resided with her in Derry Township, where he was employed as a watchman for a local steel plant. Described once again as a house plasterer on the 1920 federal census, he was documented as residing in Lewistown's 5th Ward that year with "Carrie".

His second wife then preceded him in death, dying in Lewistown on October 18, 1922. On October 1, 1924, he was awarded an increase in his U.S. Civil War Pension from $60 to $82 per month (made retroactive to August 1, 1923). His pension records during these years also documented that he was a Medal of Honor recipient.

== Medal of Honor citation ==
The citation presented with Landis’ Medal of Honor reads the following:

Rank and organization: Chief Bugler, 1st Pennsylvania Cavalry. Place and date: At Paines Crossroads, Va., April 5, 1865. Entered service at: ------. Birth: Mifflin County, Pa. Date of issue: May 3, 1865.

Citation:

Capture of flag.

== See also ==
- List of Medal of Honor recipients
- List of American Civil War Medal of Honor recipients: A–F
- Musician (rank)
- Pennsylvania in the American Civil War
