= Alexander Elliott =

Alexander Elliott may refer to:

- Alexander Calvin Elliott (1831–1905), United States soldier and Medal of Honor recipient
- Alexander Leslie Elliott (1902–1975), Canadian lawyer and politician from Ontario
- Alex Elliott (born 1987), Canadian soccer player
- Alex Elliott (footballer, born 1905), Scottish footballer

== See also ==
- Alexander Elliot (disambiguation)
