= 16th Pennsylvania Cavalry Regiment =

Union Army cavalry regiment

16th Pennsylvania Cavalry
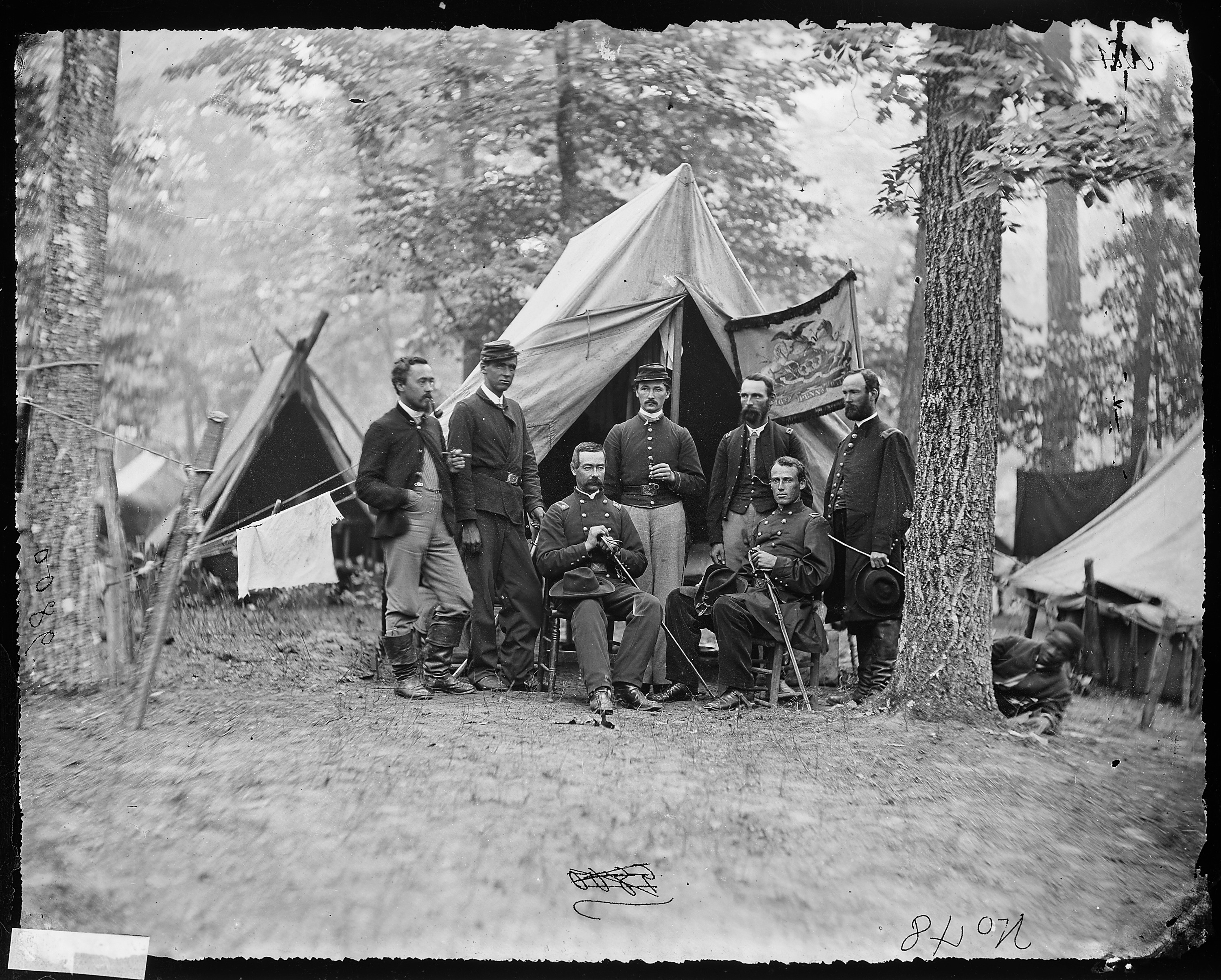
- Active: September 1862 to August 11, 1865
- Country: United States
- Allegiance: Union
- Branch: Cavalry
- Engagements: Battle of Kelly's Ford; Battle of Gettysburg; Bristoe Campaign; Mine Run Campaign; Battle of Haw's Shop; Battle of Cold Harbor; Battle of Trevilian Station; Battle of Saint Mary's Church; Siege of Petersburg; First Battle of Deep Bottom; Second Battle of Ream's Station; Battle of Boydton Plank Road; Battle of Hatcher's Run; Appomattox Campaign; Battle of Five Forks; Battle of Sailor's Creek; Battle of Appomattox Court House

The 16th Pennsylvania Cavalry (161st Volunteers) was a cavalry regiment that served in the Union Army during the American Civil War.

== Service ==
The 16th Pennsylvania Cavalry was organized at Harrisburg, Pennsylvania beginning in September 1862 as the "161st Volunteers" and mustered in for three years service under the command of Colonel John Irvin Gregg.

The regiment was attached to Defenses of Washington to January 1863. Averill's Cavalry Brigade, Army of the Potomac, to February 1863. 2nd Brigade, 2nd Division, Cavalry Corps, Army of the Potomac, to June 1863. 3rd Brigade, 2nd Division, Cavalry Corps, Army of the Potomac, to August 1863. 2nd Brigade, 2nd Division, Cavalry Corps, Army of the Potomac, to May 1865. Department of Virginia to August 1865.

The 16th Pennsylvania Cavalry mustered out August 11, 1865.

== Detailed service ==
The regiment left Pennsylvania for Washington, D.C., on November 23, 1862. It was then stationed at Camp Casey, near Bladensburg, Maryland, until January 3, 1863.

Its first moved in 1863 was to Falmouth, Virginia on January 3. The regiment then took up duty on the line of the Rappahannock River until April 1863. It was involved in operations at Rappahannock Bridge and Grove Church February 5–7. Hartwood Church February 25. Kelly's Ford March 17. Operations about Bealeton Station April 13–27. Elk Run April 13. Next it was involved in the Chancellorsville Campaign from April 26-May 8. Specifically it participated in Stoneman's Raid April 29-May 8. Kelly's Ford April 29. Ely's Ford May 2. Brandy Station, Stevensburg, and Beverly Ford June 9. Aldie June 17. Near Middleburg June 18. Middleburg June 19. Battle of Gettysburg July 1–3. Steven's Furnace July 5. Shepherdstown, West Virginia, July 14–16. Little Washington August 27. Advance to the Rapidan September 13–17. Culpeper Court House September 13. Crooked Run September 18. Bristoe Campaign October 9–22. Warrenton or White Sulphur Springs October 12–13. Auburn and Bristoe October 14. St. Stephen's Church October 14. Catlett's Station October 14. Mine Run Campaign November 26-December 2. New Hope Church November 27. Parker's Store November 29. Expedition to Luray December 21–23. Amissville, Gaines Cross Roads, and Sperryville December 22.

The regiment started 1864 off by participating in Kilpatrick's Raid on Richmond February 28-March 4, 1864. Beaver Dam Station February 29. Fortifications of Richmond March 1. Rapidan Campaign May–June. Todd's Tavern, Wilderness, May 5–8. Sheridan's Raid to James River May 9–24. North Anna River May 9–10. Ground Squirrel Church and Yellow Tavern May 11. Brook Church, Fortifications of Richmond, May 12. Milford Station May 21. Line of the Pamunkey May 26–28. Haw's Shop May 28. Totopotomoy May 28–31. Cold Harbor May 31-June 1. Sumner's Upper Bridge June 2. Sheridan's Trevilian Raid June 7–24. Trevilian Station June 11–12. White House or St. Peter's Church June 21. Black Creek or Tunstall Station June 21. St. Mary's Church June 24. Siege operations against Petersburg and Richmond July 1864 to April 1865. Warwick Swamp July 12, 1864. Demonstration on north side of the James at Deep Bottom July 27–29. Deep Bottom July 28–29. Malvern Hill July 28. Warwick Swamp July 30. Demonstration on north side of James River at Deep Bottom August 13–20. Gravel Hill August 14. Strawberry Plains, Deep Bottom, August 14–18. Charles City Cross Roads August 16. Dinwiddie Road, near Ream's Station, August 23. Ream's Station August 25. Reconnaissance to Poplar Springs Church September 13. Reconnaissance toward Dinwiddie Court House September 15. Poplar Springs Church September 29-October 2. Arthur's Swamp September 30-October 1. Boydton Plank Road, Hatcher's Run, October 27–28. Reconnaissance to Stony Creek November 7. Near Lee's Mills November 16 (detachment). Stony Creek Station December 1. Hicksford Raid December 7–12. Bellefield December 8. Disputantia Station January 9, 1865. Dabney's Mills, Hatcher's Run, February 5–7. Appomattox Campaign March 28-April 9. Dinwiddie Court House March 30–31. Five Forks April 1. Paine's Cross Roads and Amelia Springs April 5. Sailor's Creek April 6. Farmville April 7. Appomattox Court House April 9. Surrender of Lee and his army. Expedition to Danville April 23–29. Moved to Lynchburg, Va., and duty there and in the Department of Virginia until August.

== Casualties ==
The regiment lost a total of 302 men during service; 5 officers and 100 enlisted men killed or mortally wounded, 3 officers and 194 enlisted men died of disease.

== Commanders and other notable members ==
- Colonel John Irvin Gregg
- Colonel Lorenzo D. Rodgers
- Lieutenant Colonel John K. Robison
- Major Seth T. Kennedy – commanded during the Mine Run Campaign
- Chief Bugler Ferdinand F. Rohm – Medal of Honor recipient for action at the Second Battle of Ream's Station
- Lieutenant Thomas M Downs who was captured and moved out of state as a political prisoner in Bloomsburg, PA when trying to vote.
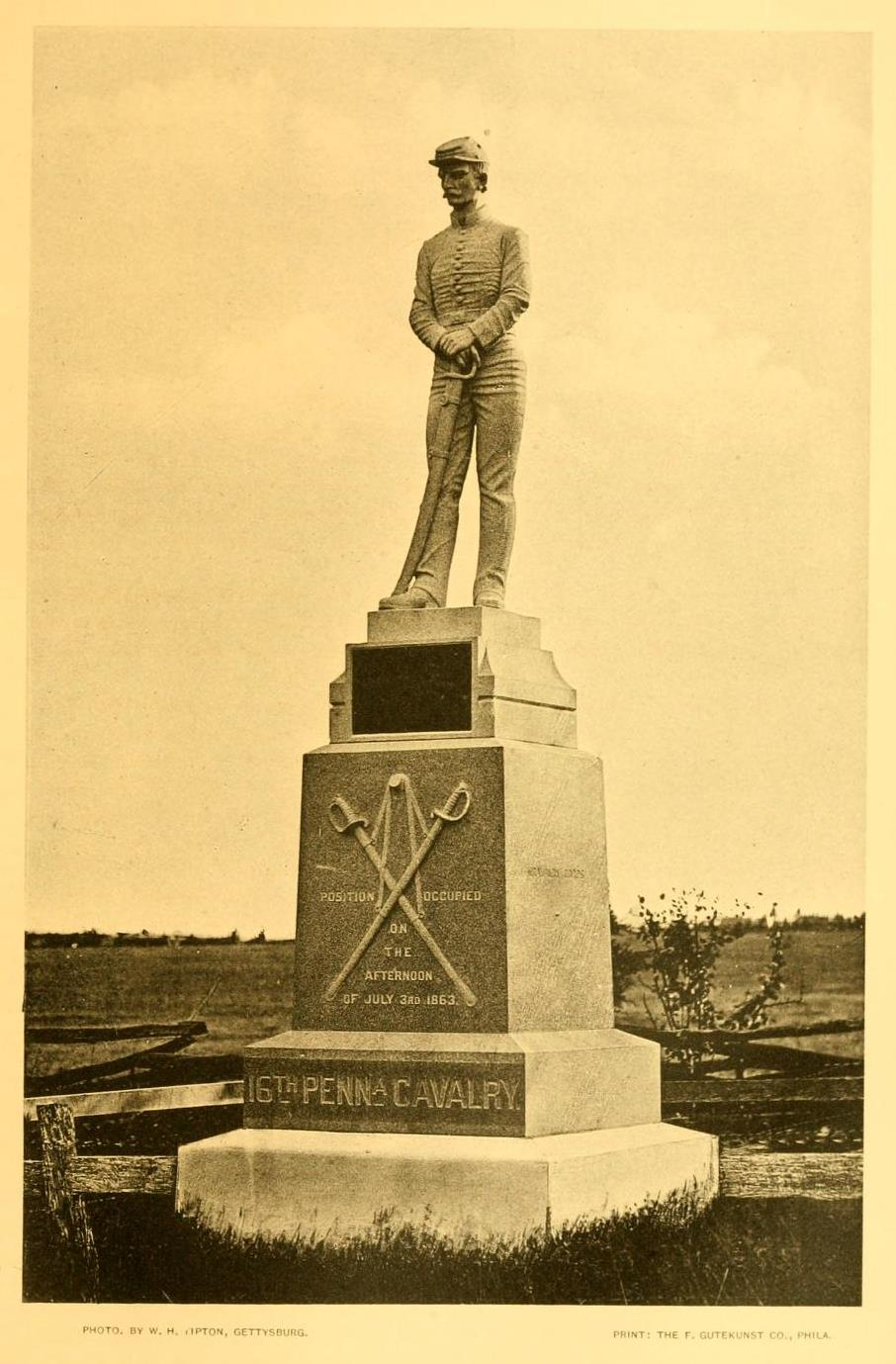
16th Pennsylvania Cavalry Monument (1884), Gettysburg Battlefield

== See also ==
- List of Pennsylvania Civil War regiments
- Pennsylvania in the American Civil War
