= James Landis =

James Landis may refer to:

- James P. Landis (1843–1924), American soldier and Medal of Honor recipient
- James M. Landis (1899–1964), American academic, government official and legal adviser
- James Nobel Landis (1899–1989), American power engineer, founding member of the National Academy of Engineering
- James Landis (director) (1926–1991), American film director in the 1960s
- Jim Landis (1934–2017), American baseball player
- J. D. Landis (James David Landis, born 1942), American author
