= Alexander Calvin Elliott =

Medal of Honor recipient (1831–1905)

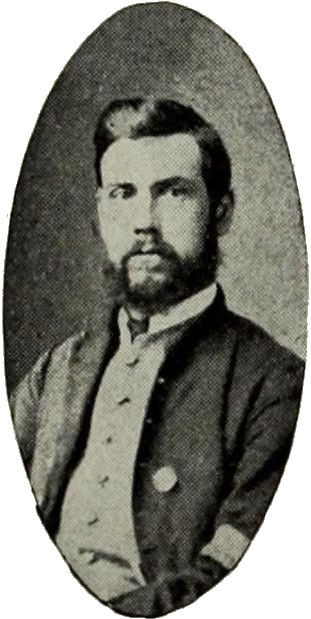
- Born: December 20, 1831; Beaver County, Pennsylvania
- Died: February 9, 1905 (aged 73); Pittsburgh, Pennsylvania
- Burial place: Highwood Cemetery, Pittsburgh, Pennsylvania
- Military career
- Allegiance: United States of America
- Branch: United States Army (Union Army)
- Rank: Sergeant
- Units: Company A, 1st Pennsylvania Cavalry
- Conflicts: American Civil War: Battle of Cross Keys; Battle of Cedar Mountain; Battle of Thoroughfare Gap; Second Battle of Bull Run; Battle of Chantilly; Battle of Antietam; Battle of Fredericksburg; Burnside's "Mud March"; Chancellorsville Campaign; Stoneman's 1863 raid; Battle of Aldie; Gettysburg campaign; Battle of Gettysburg; Battle of Culpeper Court House; Bristoe Campaign; Mine Run Campaign; Battle of Todd's Tavern; Overland Campaign; Battle of Yellow Tavern; Battle of Haw's Shop; Battle of Totopotomoy Creek; Battle of Cold Harbor; Battle of Trevilian Station; Battle of Poplar Springs Church; Battle of Hatcher's Run; Battle of Dinwiddie Court House; Appomattox Campaign; Battle of Five Forks; Battle of Paine's Cross Roads; Battle of Appomattox Court House
- Awards: Medal of Honor

Alexander Calvin Elliott (December 20, 1831 – February 9, 1905) was a United States soldier who fought with the Union Army during the American Civil War as a sergeant with Company A of the 1st Pennsylvania Cavalry. He received his nation's highest award for valor, the U.S. Medal of Honor, for his actions at Paines Crossroads, Virginia on April 5, 1865. That award was conferred on May 3, 1865.

== Biography ==
Elliott was born in Beaver County, Pennsylvania on December 20, 1831.

== Civil War ==
Alexander Elliott became one of the early responders to President Abraham Lincoln's call for volunteers to help defend Washington, D.C. following the fall of Fort Sumter to Confederate States Army troops in mid-April 1861. Following his enrollment in Pittsburgh, Pennsylvania on August 23, 1861, he then officially mustered in at Camp Wilkins in Pittsburgh that same day as a sergeant with Company I of the 1st Pennsylvania Cavalry (also known as the 44th Pennsylvania Volunteers). Military records at the time described him as being a 32-year-old farmer and resident of Beaver County who was 5' 10-1/2" tall with black hair, brown eyes and a fair complexion.

Initially assigned with his regiment to picket and scout duties in Maryland and Virginia during the fall and winter of 1861, Elliott and his fellow 1st Pennsylvania Cavalrymen were then attached to the Army of the Potomac (McCall's division) in March 1862, to McDowell's I Corps in April, and then to the Union's Department of the Rappahannock (Bayard's Cavalry), during which time they fought in the Battle of Cross Keys (June 8, 1862), skirmished with the enemy at Madison Court House (July 23) and Slaughter House (August 8), fought in the battles of Cedar Mountain (August 9), Thoroughfare Gap (August 28), Second Bull Run (August 28–30), Chantilly (September 1), Antietam (September 16–17), and Fredericksburg (December 11–15).

Engaged with other Union troops in Major-General Ambrose Burnside's "Mud March" in January 1863, Elliot and his regiment were then assigned to picket duties between Falmouth and Port Conway until late April when they were ordered to duty in the Chancellorsville Campaign. After participating in Stoneman's 1863 raid, they fought in the Battle of Aldie (June 17). Reassigned to the Gettysburg campaign, they fought in the Battle of Gettysburg (July 1–3), and pursued the enemy from Pennsylvania back into Maryland and Virginia throughout the late summer and early fall. After fighting next in the Battle of Culpeper Court House (September 13), they engaged in the Bristoe Campaign (October 9–22) and the Mine Run Campaign (November 26-December 2).

Elliott re-enlisted for a second tour of duty on January 1, 1864 at Warrenton, Virginia, Elliot and his regiment then engaged in the Union's Expedition to Turkey Run through January 4; the Campaign from the Rapidan to the James (May 4-June 12), which included the Battle of Todd's Tavern (May 7); Lieutenant-General Ulysses S. Grant's Overland Campaign, which included the Battle of Yellow Tavern (May 11), Sheridan's Raid on Richmond through May 24, and the battles of Haw's Shop (May 28), Totopotomoy Creek (May 28–31), Cold Harbor (June 1–12), Trevilian Station (June 11–12). Elliott then sustained a gunshot wound to the groin and thigh during Union operations on June 21. Following recovery from his wounds, he was transferred to an artillery battery on September 9. Engaged with his newly reconstituted regiment in the Richmond-Petersburg Campaign, he then fought in the battles of Poplar Springs Church (September 29-October 2, 1864), Hatcher's Run (February 5–7, 1865) and Dinwiddie Court House (March 30–31) before entering the war-ending Appomattox Campaign and the Battle of Five Forks (April 1).

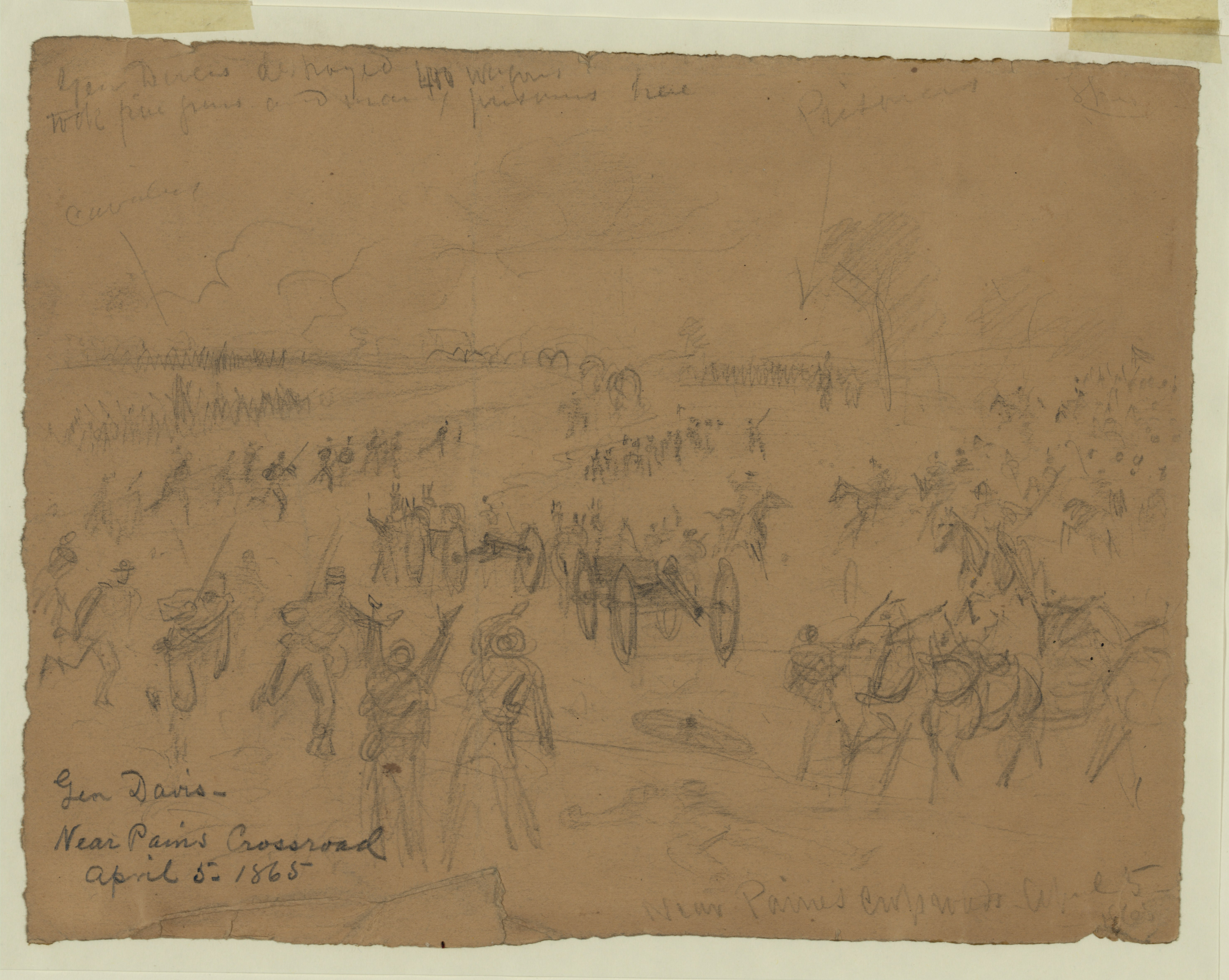
General Davis and his troops near Paine's Cross Roads, Virginia, April 5, 1865 (Alfred Waud).

Elliott then performed the act of valor for which he would later be awarded the U.S. Medal of Honor. Engaged in operations with the 1st Pennsylvania Cavalry and other Union troops at Paine's Cross Roads, Virginia on April 5, 1865, he captured the flag of an enemy regiment.

Engaged with his regiment at Farmville (April 7), Elliot next fought in the Battle of Appomattox Court House (April 9), and subsequently participated with his regiment and other Union troops in securing the surrender of the Confederate States Army by General Robert E. Lee. Following the regiment's participation in the Union's Grand Review of the Armies on May 23, Elliott was then honorably discharged by Special Order No. 312 on June 17, 1865.

== Post-war life ==
Following his honorable discharge from the military, Elliott returned home to Pennsylvania where, in 1866, he wed Ohio native Isabella Young (1835–1905). Their son, Clarence (1868–1935), was born in Poland, Ohio in 1868. He continued to reside with his family in that community through 1890.

Elliott died in Pittsburgh, Pennsylvania on February 9, 1905. Following funeral services, he was buried at the Highwood Cemetery in Pittsburgh.

== Medal of Honor citation ==
Elliott received his Medal of Honor for gallantry during the Appomattox Campaign while participating in Union Army operations at Paine's Cross Roads on April 5, 1865. Award Issued: May 3, 1865. His citation read:

The President of the United States of America, in the name of Congress, takes pleasure in presenting the Medal of Honor to Sergeant Alexander Elliott, United States Army, for extraordinary heroism on April 5, 1865, while serving with Company A, 1st Pennsylvania Cavalry, in action at Paines Crossroads, Virginia, for capture of flag.

== See also ==
- Cavalry in the American Civil War
- List of American Civil War Medal of Honor recipients: A–F
- Pennsylvania in the American Civil War
