= Charles Higby =

- Born: 1841; Pittsburgh, Pennsylvania, US
- Died: February 19, 1903 (aged 61–62); McLoud, Oklahoma, US
- Burial place: McLoud, Oklahoma, US
- Military career
- Allegiance: United States
- Branch: United States Army
- Service years: 1862 - 1865
- Rank: Private
- Units: Company F, 1st Pennsylvania Cavalry Regiment
- Conflicts: American Civil War • Appomattox Campaign
- Awards: Medal of Honor

Charles Higby (1841 – February 19, 1903) was a Union Army soldier in the American Civil War and a recipient of the United States military's highest decoration, the Medal of Honor, for his actions during the Appomattox Campaign.

== Biography ==
Born in 1841 in Pittsburgh, Pennsylvania, Higby was living in nearby New Brighton when he enlisted in the Union Army in August 1862. He served as a private in Company F of the 1st Pennsylvania Cavalry during the Appomattox Campaign, which took place from March 29 to April 9, 1865, in Virginia. For his conduct in this campaign, he received the Medal of Honor a month later, on May 3, 1865. His official citation reads simply: "Capture of flag".

After the war, Higby returned to New Brighton before settling in Oklahoma. He died on February 19, 1903, at age 61 or 62 and was buried in McLoud, Oklahoma.

Higby's Medal of Honor is owned by his extended family and is on loan to the Soldiers and Sailors National Military Museum and Memorial in Pittsburgh.

== MoH Citation ==
Capture of flag.

== See also ==
- List of Medal of Honor recipients
