= Alexander Elliot =

Alexander Elliot may refer to:

- Alexander Elliot (British Army officer) (1825–1909), British Major-General
- Alexander Elliot (actor) (born 2004), Canadian television actor
- Alec Elliot (born 1996), Canadian Paralympic swimmer
- Alexander Eliot, American writer

== See also ==
- Alexander Elliott (disambiguation)
