= John A. Davidsizer =

American soldier (1834–1913)

- Born: April 26, 1834; Milford, Pennsylvania, US
- Died: October 19, 1913 (aged 79); Lewistown, Pennsylvania, US
- Military career
- Allegiance: United States
- Branch: United States Army; Union Army
- Rank: Sergeant
- Unit: 1st Pennsylvania Cavalry - Company A,
- Awards: Medal of Honor

Sergeant John A. Davidsizer (April 26, 1834 – October 19, 1913) was an American soldier who fought in the American Civil War. Davidsizer received the United States' highest award for bravery during combat, the Medal of Honor, for his action at Paines Crossroads, Virginia on 5 April 1865. He was honored with the award on 3 May 1865.

== Biography ==
Davidsizer was born in Milford, Pennsylvania on 26 April 1834. He enlisted into the 1st Pennsylvania Cavalry. He died on 19 October 1913.

== Medal of Honor citation ==
Capture of flag.

== See also ==
- List of American Civil War Medal of Honor recipients: A–F
