= Kelly's Ford, Virginia =

Coordinates: 38°28′38″N 77°46′48″W

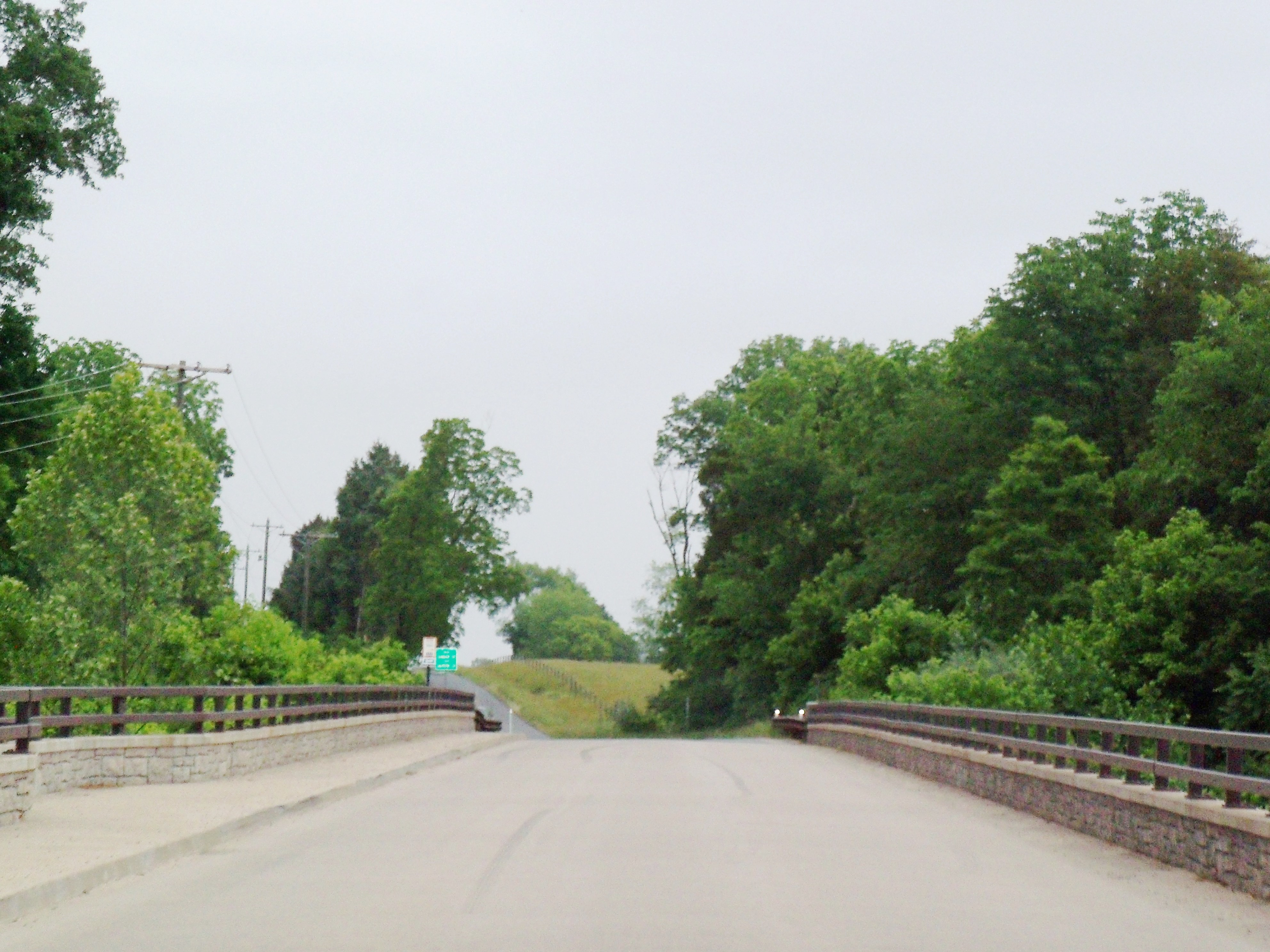
Modern bridge at Kelly's Ford

Kelly's Ford was a major crossing point on the Rappahannock River. It was the site of the Civil War Battle of Kelly's Ford in March of 1863, and a major obstacle to General George Stoneman's raid in April of the same year. Today it is the only crossing on the river between Fredericksburg and Remington. It is the location of the Inn at Kelly's Ford and the Kelly's Ford Equestrian Center. It is also a frequently used launch point for canoe trips down the mostly untouched river.

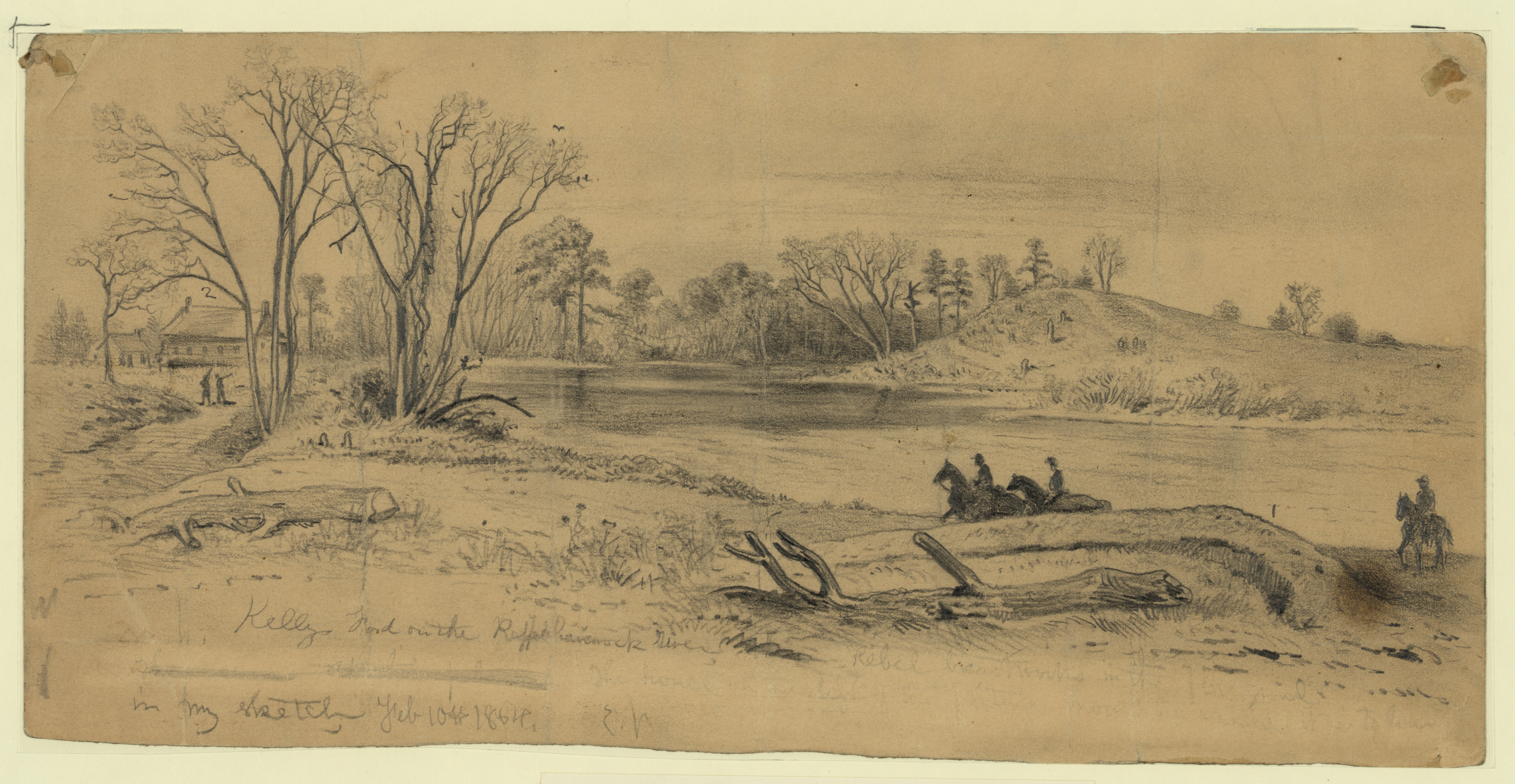
Kelly's Ford in 1864
