= Battle of Amelia Springs =

Battle of the American Civil War

Coordinates: 37.3344°N 78.079°W

- Part of the American Civil War
Date	April 5, 1865
Location	Amelia County, Virginia
Result	Inconclusive

Belligerents
United States (Union)	(Confederate States of America) Confederate States (Confederacy)

Commanders and leaders
George Crook	Fitzhugh Lee; Thomas L. Rosser

Casualties and losses
158 (Note: Davis, Burke. To Appomattox: Nine April Days, 1865. New York: Eastern Acorn Press reprint, 1981. ISBN 978-0-915992-17-1. First published New York: Rinehart, 1959, states that Davies took about 1,000 prisoners, five cannons and several hundred thin mules while destroying 180 wagons. This accords with Davies's own brief account of the battle in Davies, Jr., Henry Eugene. General Sheridan. New York: D. Appleton and Company, 1895. OCLC 693591497. Retrieved December 27, 2010. pp. 239–240. Eicher, David J. The Longest Night: A Military History of the Civil War. New York: Simon & Schuster, 2001. ISBN 978-0-684-84944-7. says that Davies took 700 prisoners and destroyed 200 wagons, including many of General Lee's headquarters papers. Salmon, John S. The Official Virginia Civil War Battlefield Guide. Mechanicsburg, PA: Stackpole Books, 2001. ISBN 978-0-8117-2868-3 says that Davies took 600 prisoners. Edward G. Longacre gives figures of 300 in Lincoln's Cavalrymen: A History of the Mounted Forces of the Army of the Potomac. Mechanicsburg, PA: Stackpole Books, 2000. ISBN 978-0-8117-1049-7, p. 329 but, in accord with Salmon, gives 600 in The Cavalry at Appomattox: A Tactical Study of Mounted Operations During the Civil War's Climactic Campaign, March 27 – April 9, 1865. Mechanicsburg, PA: Stackpole Books, 2003. ISBN 978-0-8117-0051-1, p. 130.)	About 100 (Note: See casualties references in previous footnote.)

The Battle of Amelia Springs, Virginia was an engagement between the Union Army (Army of the Shenandoah, Army of the Potomac and Army of the James) and Confederate Army of Northern Virginia that occurred on April 5, 1865 during the Appomattox Campaign of the American Civil War. It was followed by a second rear guard action near the same location on the night of April 5, 1865 and morning of April 6, 1865 during the Union Army pursuit of the Confederate forces (Army of Northern Virginia and Richmond local defense forces) which were fleeing westward after the fall of Petersburg and Richmond, Virginia at the Third Battle of Petersburg (sometimes shown as the Breakthrough at Petersburg) on April 2, 1865. The actions took place just prior to the Battle of Sailor's Creek (sometimes shown as "Sayler's Creek") on April 6, 1865. That battle would be the last major engagement between the Union Army under the overall direction of Union General-in-Chief, Lt. Gen. Ulysses S. Grant, and General Robert E. Lee's Army of Northern Virginia before that Confederate army's surrender at Appomattox Court House, Virginia on April 9, 1865.

On April 5, 1865, Confederate cavalry under the command of Brig. Gen. Martin Gary, reinforced by cavalry from the divisions of Maj. Gen. Thomas L. Rosser and Colonel Thomas T. Munford, which were under the overall command of Maj. Gen. Fitzhugh Lee, counterattacked a brigade of Union cavalry led by Brig. Gen. Henry E. Davies, Jr. Davies's brigade was part of the division commanded by Maj. Gen. George Crook, which in turn was under the overall command of Maj. Gen. Philip Sheridan. Davies's force was returning from a scout during which they burned Confederate wagons in the vicinity of Paineville, Virginia (Paineville area of Amelia County, Virginia), about 7 miles (11 km) north of Jetersville, Virginia. The wagons were carrying supplies and equipment for the Army of Northern Virginia. The running fight after the Paineville action started 3 miles (4.8 km) north of Amelia Springs and continued through Amelia Springs almost to Jetersville, Virginia on the South Side Railroad. Jetersville, which was 6 miles (9.7 km) southwest of Amelia Court House, Virginia where Lee's forces were concentrating, had been held by Sheridan's forces since the day before. The battle was inconclusive in that the Confederate forces had to return to Amelia Springs when Davies's troops were able to join with other Union forces as they approached Jetersville. During the night of April 5, 1865, Union Army divisions under the command of Brig. Gen. Nelson A. Miles and Maj. Gen. Gershom Mott fought a minor and inconclusive action against the Army of Northern Virginia rear guard commanded by Maj. Gen. John B. Gordon near Amelia Springs.

Although casualties for both sides in both engagements have been stated to be light and about even at less than 250 combined, the Union commanders reported suffering 158 casualties. The Confederates presumably suffered fewer than 100. (Note: Eicher, 2001, p. 815 says Davies lost 20 men killed and 96 wounded.) In addition, Davies's men took over 300 Confederate prisoners in the Paineville action immediately preceding the counterattack which precipitated the running battle through and beyond Amelia Springs almost to Jetersville. (Note: Davis, 1981, p. 232 states that Davies took about 1,000 prisoners, five cannons and several hundred thin mules while destroying 180 wagons. This accords with Davies's own brief account of the battle in Davies, 1895, pp. 239–240. Eicher, 2001, p. 815 says that Davies took 700 prisoners and destroyed 200 wagons, including many of Gen. Lee's headquarters papers.)

== Background ==
=== Siege and Breakthrough at Petersburg ===
During the 292-day Richmond–Petersburg Campaign (Siege of Petersburg) Union General-in-Chief Ulysses S. Grant had to conduct a campaign of trench warfare and attrition in which the Union forces tried to wear down the less numerous Confederate Army of Northern Virginia, destroy or cut off sources of supply and supply lines to Petersburg and Richmond and extend the defensive lines which the outnumbered and declining Confederate force had to defend to the breaking point. After the Battle of Hatcher's Run on February 5–7, 1865 extended the armies' lines another 4 miles (6.4 km), Lee had few reserves after manning the lengthened Confederate defenses. Lee knew he must soon move part or all of his army from the Richmond and Petersburg lines, obtain food and supplies at Danville, Virginia or possibly Lynchburg, Virginia and join General Joseph E. Johnston's force opposing Major General William T. Sherman's army in North Carolina. Lee thought that if the Confederates could quickly defeat Sherman, they might turn back to oppose Grant before he could combine his forces with Sherman's.

After an offensive begun on the night of March 28–March 29, 1865 that included the Battle of Lewis's Farm, Battle of White Oak Road and the Battle of Dinwiddie Court House, Lieutenant General Ulysses S. Grant's Union Army (Army of the Potomac, Army of the James, Army of the Shenandoah) broke the Confederate States Army defenses of Petersburg, Virginia at the Battle of Five Forks on April 1 and the Third Battle of Petersburg on April 2. A Union division under the command of Brigadier General Nelson A. Miles also broke up the last defense of the South Side Railroad on the afternoon of April 2, cutting off that railroad as a supply line or route of retreat for the Confederates. General Robert E. Lee's Army of Northern Virginia evacuated Petersburg, Virginia and the Confederate capital of Richmond, Virginia on the night of April 2–3 and began a retreat in hopes of reaching Danville, Virginia and then linking up with General Joseph E. Johnston's army attempting to slow the advance the Union army group commanded by Major General William T. Sherman in North Carolina.

=== Confederate army flight ===
Much of the Army of Northern Virginia as well as Confederate President Jefferson Davis and his cabinet, were able to escape from Petersburg and Richmond just in advance of the Union troops entering those cities on April 3 because Confederate rear guard forces, especially at Forts Gregg and Whitworth, Fort Mahone and Sutherland's Station, fought desperate delaying actions on April 2 to give most of the Confederates a head start on Union Army pursuers. General Lee planned to reunite the four columns of his army that left Petersburg and Richmond and to resupply at Amelia Court House, Virginia, 39 miles (63 km) southwest of Richmond. Lee's men left their positions in Petersburg and Richmond with only one day's rations. Lee expected to find a supply train of rations that he had ordered brought to Amelia Court House to meet the army at that location.

=== Pursuit and skirmishes ===
While most of Lee's army had an effective one day head start on their flight, the advance cavalry and infantry corps of the Union Army under the command of Maj. Gen. Philip Sheridan were able to keep Lee's forces to their north by pursuing Lee on a parallel course to their south. Union cavalry harassed and skirmished with Confederate units almost from the outset of Lee's army's march from Petersburg. On April 3, 1865, advance units of the Union cavalry fought with rear guard Confederate cavalry at the Battle of Namozine Church. On April 4, 1865, the opposing forces skirmished at Beaver Pond Creek or Tabernacle Church (Note: This should not be confused with the 1862 Battle of Beaver Dam Creek or Battle of Mechanicsville.) and at Amelia Court House. Meanwhile, Sheridan's forces occupied Jetersville and Burkeville Junction.

== Battles of Amelia Springs ==
=== First Engagement ===
Lee had hoped to find a supply train at Amelia Court House, Virginia, 39 miles (63 km) southwest of Richmond, but when he and his forces arrived there on April 4, 1865, he found that the train contained only ordnance, ammunition, caissons and harnesses. Lee sent out foraging parties, losing precious time in the process. Some historians have written that the primary cause of the delay at Amelia Court House was a delay in bringing up a pontoon bridge needed to cross rain-swollen rivers. In any event, this delay allowed even more Union troops to catch up to and to get ahead of his hungry, exhausted and declining force. Few supplies could be found in the depleted area near Amelia Court House. Lee had to order his hungry men to resume their march in the hope that they could find rations at Farmville, Virginia. By April 4, Sheridan's Union forces had taken advanced positions at Burkeville Junction and at Jetersville, which blocked Lee's access to the Richmond and Danville Railroad and to the direct route southwestward.

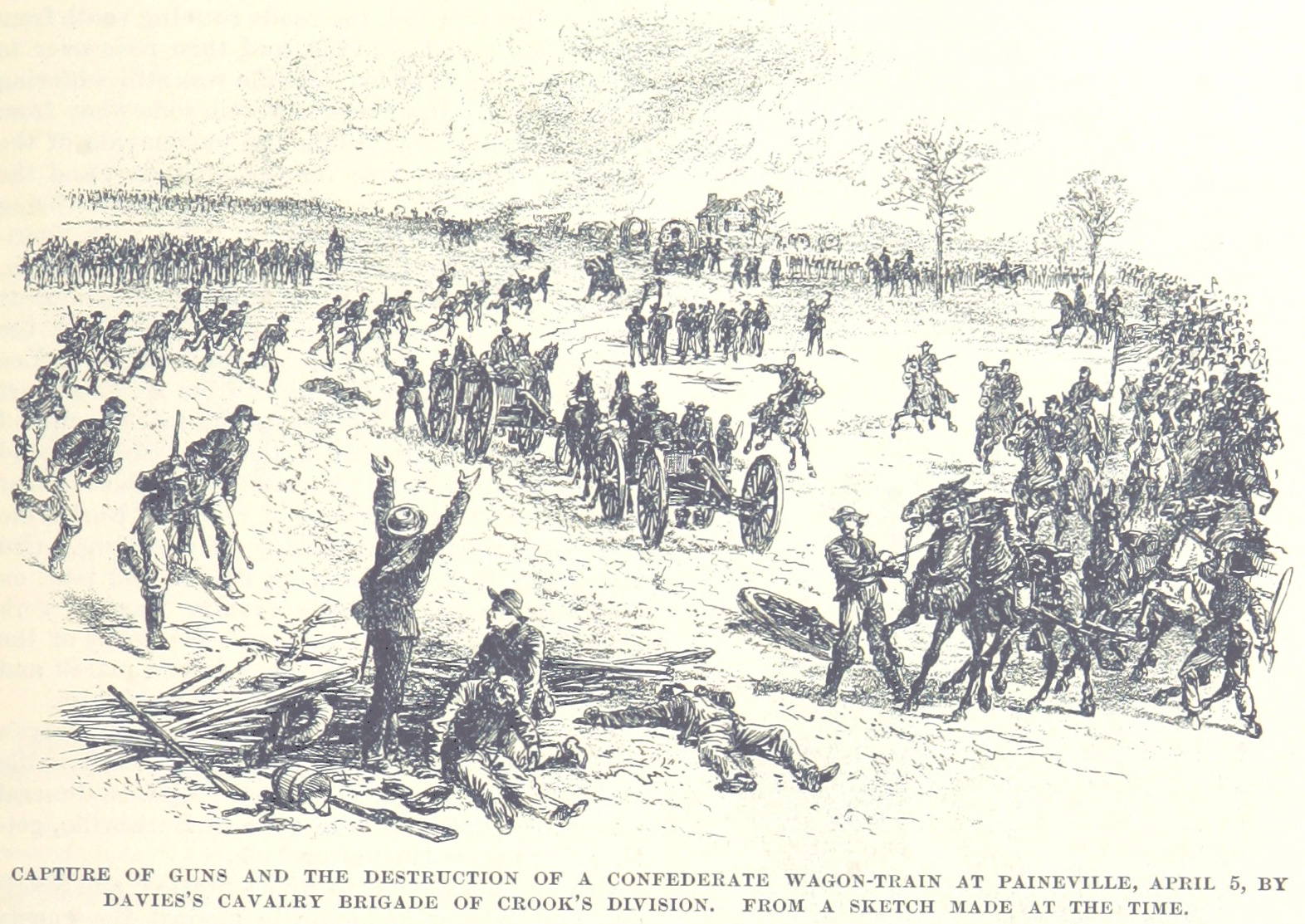
Davies captures the wagon train

On April 5, 1865, Sheridan ordered Crook to send cavalry patrols north of Jetersville to reconnoiter his left flank. At Crook's order, Union Brig. Gen. Henry E. Davies, Jr. took his brigade through Amelia Springs, Virginia and then swung north to the Paineville, Virginia area of Amelia County. About 4 miles (6.4 km) out of Jetersville, Davies attacked a Confederate army wagon train. His men destroyed the wagons, captured equipment and animals and took more than 300 and perhaps as many as 1,000 prisoners. (Note: Salmon, 2001, p. 476 says that Davies took 600 prisoners. As noted above, Longacre, Davis and Eicher give different figures of 300, 1,000 and 700 prisoners. Davis's figure is based on Davies's own number found at Davies, 1895, p. 240.) According to some sources, some of these men were armed blacks in Confederate uniforms, the only known instance in Virginia of combat involving organized black Confederate soldiers. (Note: A roadside historical marker near Amelia Springs reads in part: "Black Confederates. When Davies attacked Custis Lee's wagon train near Paineville, he encountered gray-uniformed African-American troops who defended the train before surrendering. Described by a Southern officer as "the only company of colored troops in the Confederate service," the soldiers had been recruited in Richmond after February 1865 and promised their freedom. The Paineville clash is one of the few documented engagements in Virginia involving organized black Confederate troops. They symbolized the desperate straits of the Confederacy, which had officially opposed arming blacks. http://www.hmdb.org/marker.asp?MarkerID=28834.) Some historians doubt the claim that they were soldiers and describe them simply as teamsters. In his brief account of this action in his biography of General Sheridan, General Davies made no mention of black troops. One of the items burned in the wagons was the war diary for the Army of Northern Virginia.

Upon hearing about Davies's actions, General Lee dispatched two divisions of Maj. Gen. Fitzhugh Lee's cavalry, which joined with Brig. Gen. Martin Gary's cavalry brigade at Paineville, to pursue Davies. Together they engaged Davies's rear guard in a running combat for 3 miles (4.8 km) to Amelia Springs. The Confederates attacked Davies's forces in a mounted combat with drawn sabers, forcing his men to retreat. The Confederates chased Davies's force almost to Jetersville but when Davies's men linked up with other Union Army cavalry of Maj. Gen. Crook's main force, Davies was able to retain his prisoners, mules and cannon and the Confederates returned to Amelia Springs for the night. Confederate cavalry continued to skirmish with Union forces at Jetersville and Confederate infantry demonstrated during the afternoon of April 5, 1865. The apparent purpose of these actions, after Lee discovered that the road and railroad to Burkeville was blocked by Sheridan's forces at Jetersville, was to cover for the continuing movement of the Confederate army west toward Farmville. Lee ordered supplies sent to this location from Lynchburg.

=== Second engagement, casualties ===
During the night of April 5, 1865 and morning of April 6, 1865, General Lee began to march his army from Amelia Court House, through Amelia Springs, toward Farmville. Two Union Army divisions under the command of Brig. Gen, Nelson A. Miles and Maj. Gen. Gershom Mott of the corps commanded by Maj. Gen. Andrew A. Humphreys observed the movement on the night of April 5 and pursued the Confederates. The Confederate rear guard under the command of Maj. Gen. John B. Gordon held off the Union Army attack and continued the march west while the Union forces stopped to rest for the night. During the engagement, Maj. Gen. Mott was wounded and Brig. Gen. Régis de Trobriand took command of his division.

== Aftermath ==
The Union forces suffered between 116 and 158 casualties in the Amelia Springs engagements. Confederate casualties are unknown but have been presumed to be fewer, perhaps less than 100. (Note: National Park Service estimates give casualty figures of about 250.) In addition, the Confederates suffered the loss of those soldiers and teamsters captured in the attack on the wagon train at Paineville. (Note: See note 1 in this footnotes section.)

Maj. Gen. Meade thought that the Confederate army remained concentrated at Amelia Court House and, despite the suspicions of Grant and Sheridan that the Confederates had moved on, sent the Army of the Potomac infantry in the direction of Amelia Court House in the morning of April 6, 1865. The Union forces soon discovered that Lee had started moving west and changed their direction of march to continue their pursuit. In the afternoon of April 6, 1865, approximately one-fifth (Note: Urwin, 2000, p. 1709. Some writers have said the number captured may have been nearly one-third of Lee's remaining effective soldiers but this number appears to be inflated.) the remaining soldiers of the Army of Northern Virginia (about 8,000 men, including Lt. Gen. Richard S. Ewell and eight other generals), about one-sixth of the number who had left Richmond and Petersburg, were cut off from the main body of Confederate troops at the Battle of Sailor's Creek (sometimes shown as "Battle of Sayler's Creek") and most were captured. After about five more small engagements over the next three days, with the Army of Northern Virginia melting away, and Union forces surrounding them, General Lee surrendered the Army of Northern Virginia to General Grant on April 9, 1865 at Appomattox Court House, Virginia, about 90 miles (140 km) west of Richmond.

== Battlefield Today ==
The former resort of Amelia Springs has disappeared. The battlefield property is heavily wooded, difficult to interpret, privately owned and apparently in little danger of development.
