= Stoneman's 1863 raid =

Action of the American Civil War

- Part of the American Civil War
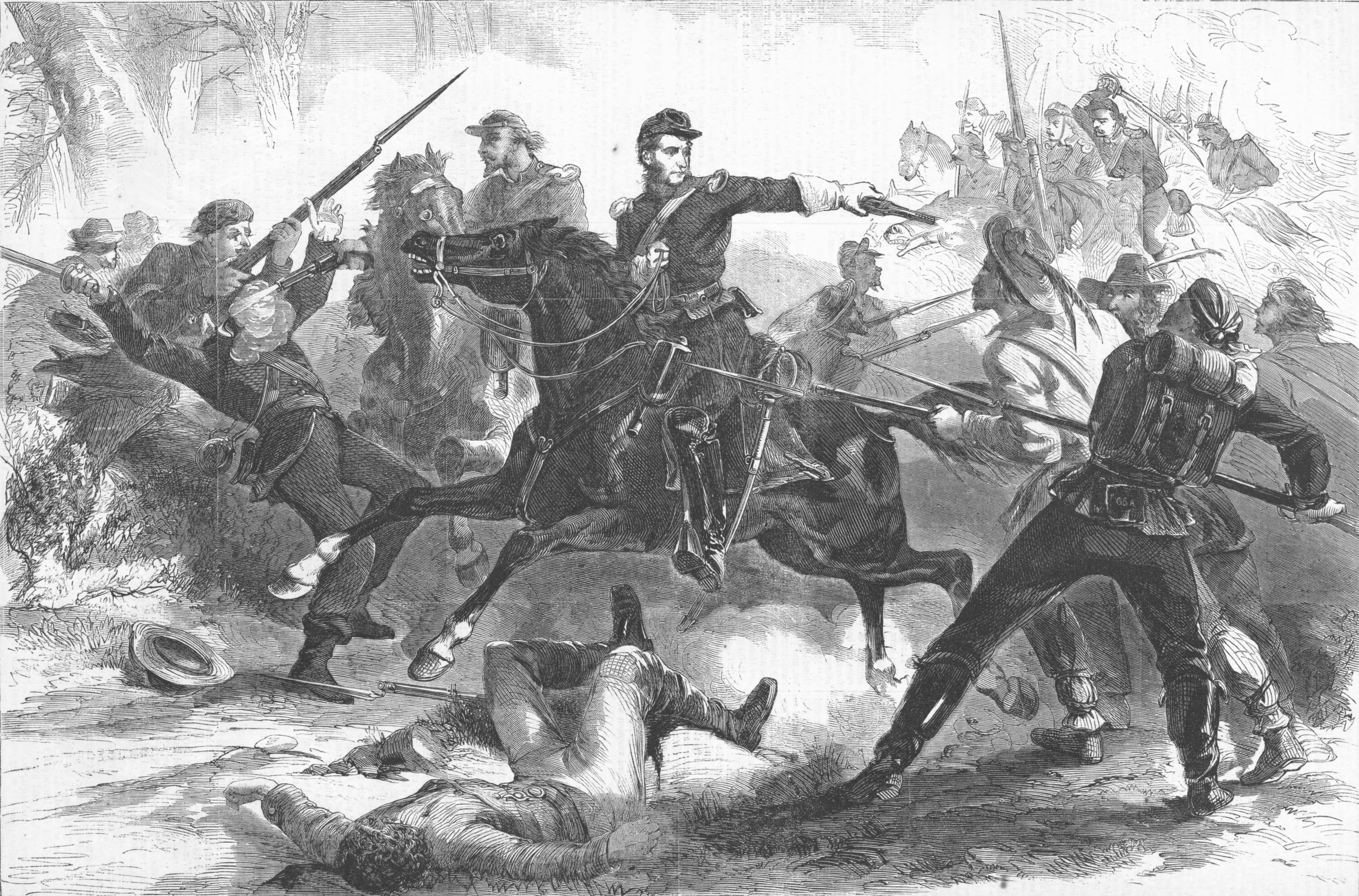
- Colonel Kilpatrick's late cavalry raid through Virginia (Harper's Weekly, 30 May 1863)
Date	April 13 – May 10, 1863
Location	Spotsylvania County, Virginia
Result	Confederate victory

Belligerents
United States (Union)	(Confederate States of America) CSA (Confederacy)

Commanders and leaders
Major General George Stoneman	General Robert E. Lee

Strength
?	?

Casualties and losses
?	?

Stoneman's raid was a cavalry operation led by General George Stoneman during the Chancellorsville Campaign that preceded the start of the Battle of Chancellorsville in the American Civil War.

== Strategy ==
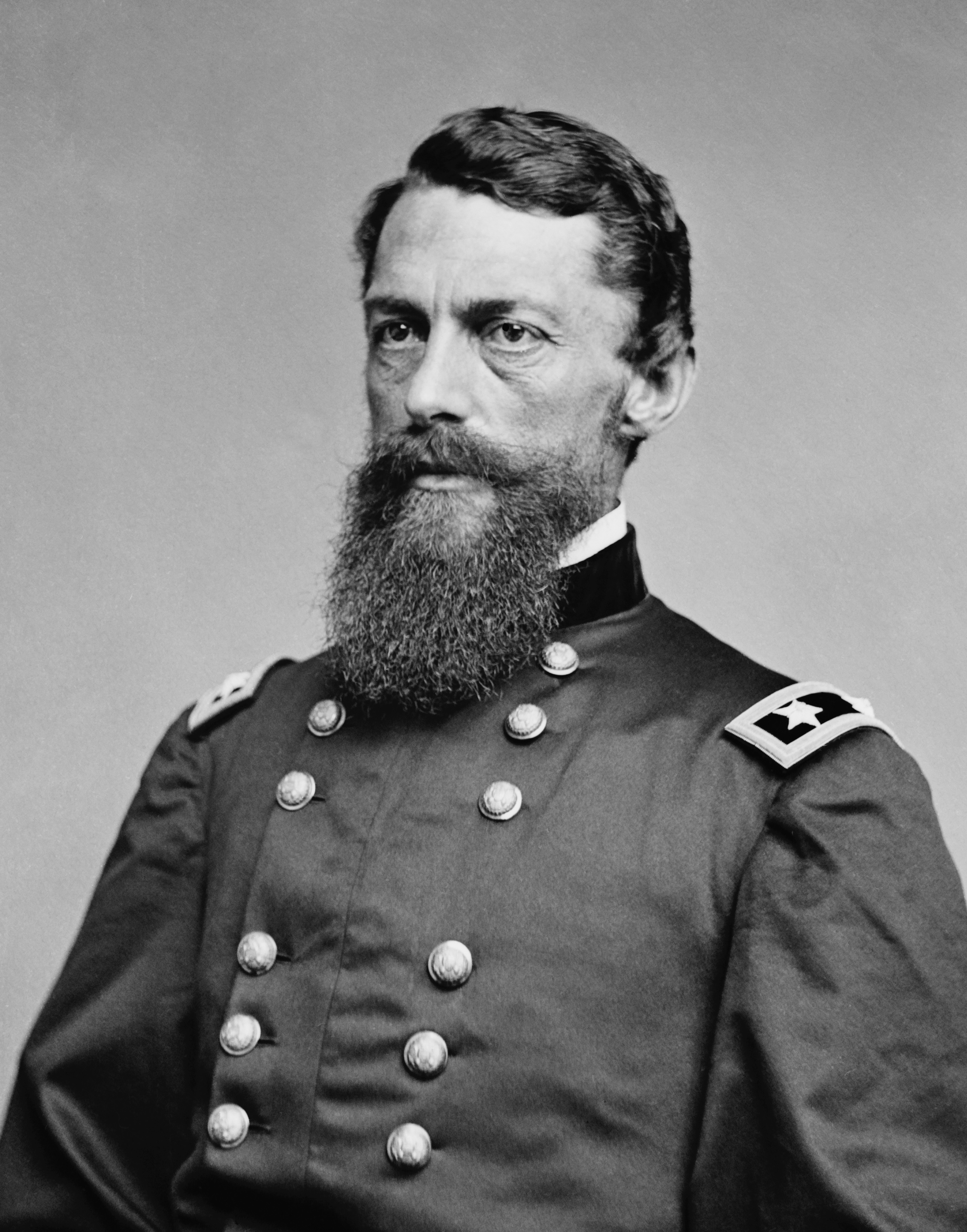
General George Stoneman

In April 1863, Major General Joseph Hooker put his army in motion to force Lee out of his Fredericksburg positions. He sent Major General George Stoneman's 10,000-strong cavalry to move between Lee and the Confederate capital, Richmond. Hooker expected Stoneman to sever Lee's line of supply by destroying the strategically vital Orange and Alexandria Railroad at the town of Gordonsville. This would, Hooker hoped, compel Lee to withdraw from Fredericksburg while cutting him off from supplies and transportation. Hooker also saw to it that John Buford was given an active field command and rode to battle in April 1863 with the Reserve Brigade, an organization that contained the majority of the Regular Army cavalry units serving in the east.

On April 12, Hooker wrote to Stoneman of the impending operation:

Let your watchword be fight, and let all your orders be fight, fight, fight.

== Prelude ==
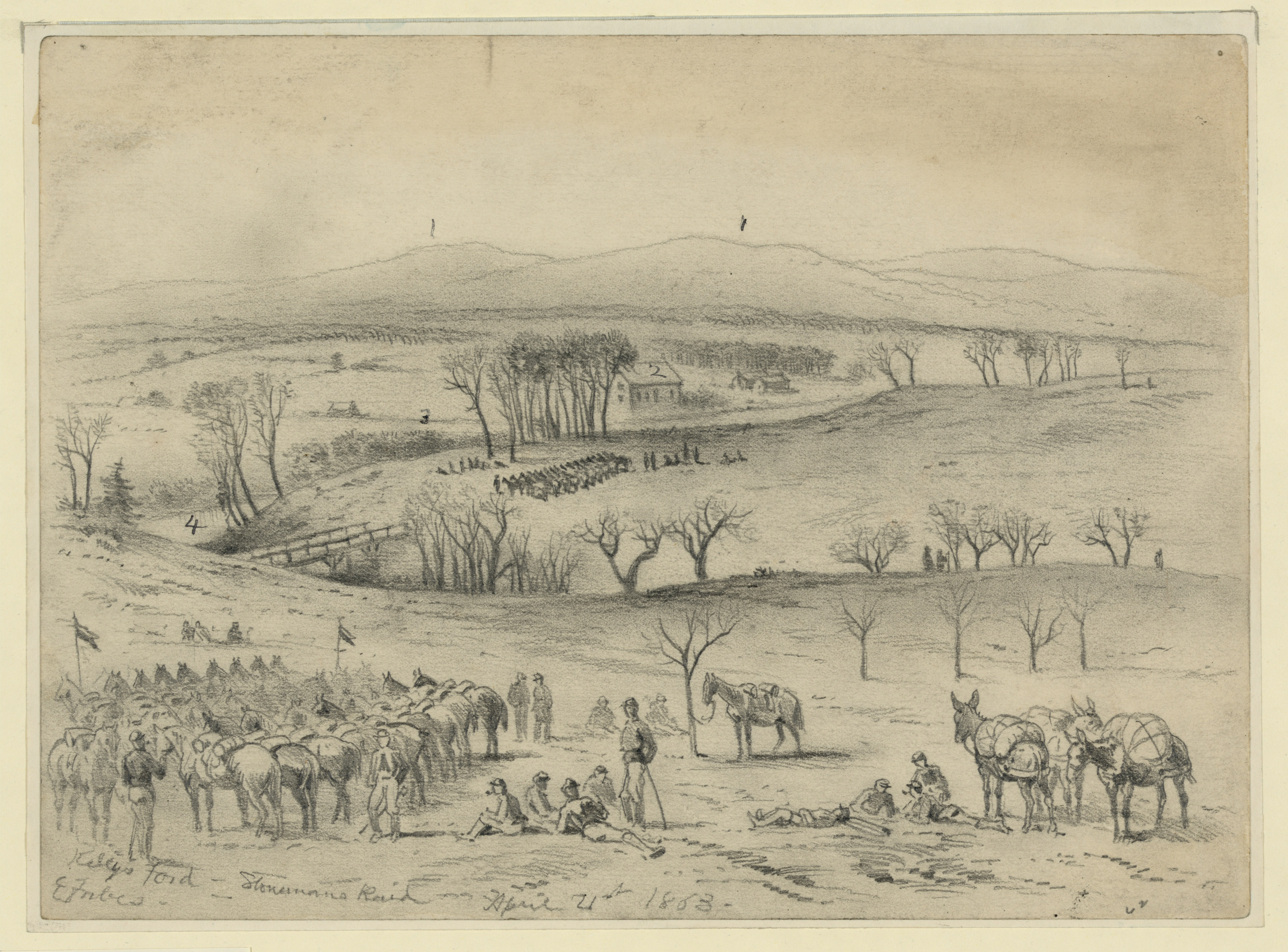
Kelly's Ford on April 21, 1863, sketched by Edwin Forbes

At 8 a.m. on April 13, 1863, Buford's Brigade, composed of the First, Second, Fifth, and Sixth U.S. Cavalry, left camp at Falmouth, Virginia, to embark on the ambitious and daring raid. As soon as the next day, they were engaged with the enemy at Kelly's Ford; the rebels firing upon the brigade with two 10-pounder Parrotts - 13 shots in total. Lieutenant Elder's four-gun battery replied, firing 12 shots, and drove the rebel guns out of sight. According to Buford's official report, by the 15th, the brigade was at Rappahannock Bridge, ready to cross but were ordered to await further instructions. However, nature had not dealt a kind hand to the Union cavalry as torrential rain turned the roads to quagmires and the streams into raging torrents. It was not until April 29 that the Reserve Brigade was able to cross at Kelly's Ford.

Over those intervening two weeks, Buford detailed the conditions facing the cavalry;

- "At 11 a.m. on the 15th, the ford was swimming..."
- "The country at that hour was like a sea. The regiment reached Morrisville on the 16th, having had Marsh Run to swim..."
- "...then started for Kelly's Ford; was prevented from reaching Kelly's Ford by bad roads and fog."
- "From the time that the brigade struck the river at Rappahannock Bridge on the 15th, up to the crossing of the river on the 29th, it seemed as though the elements were combined against our advance; such rains and roads I had never seen. During the whole expedition the roads were in a worse condition than I could have supposed to be possible, and the command was called upon to endure much severe discomfiture."

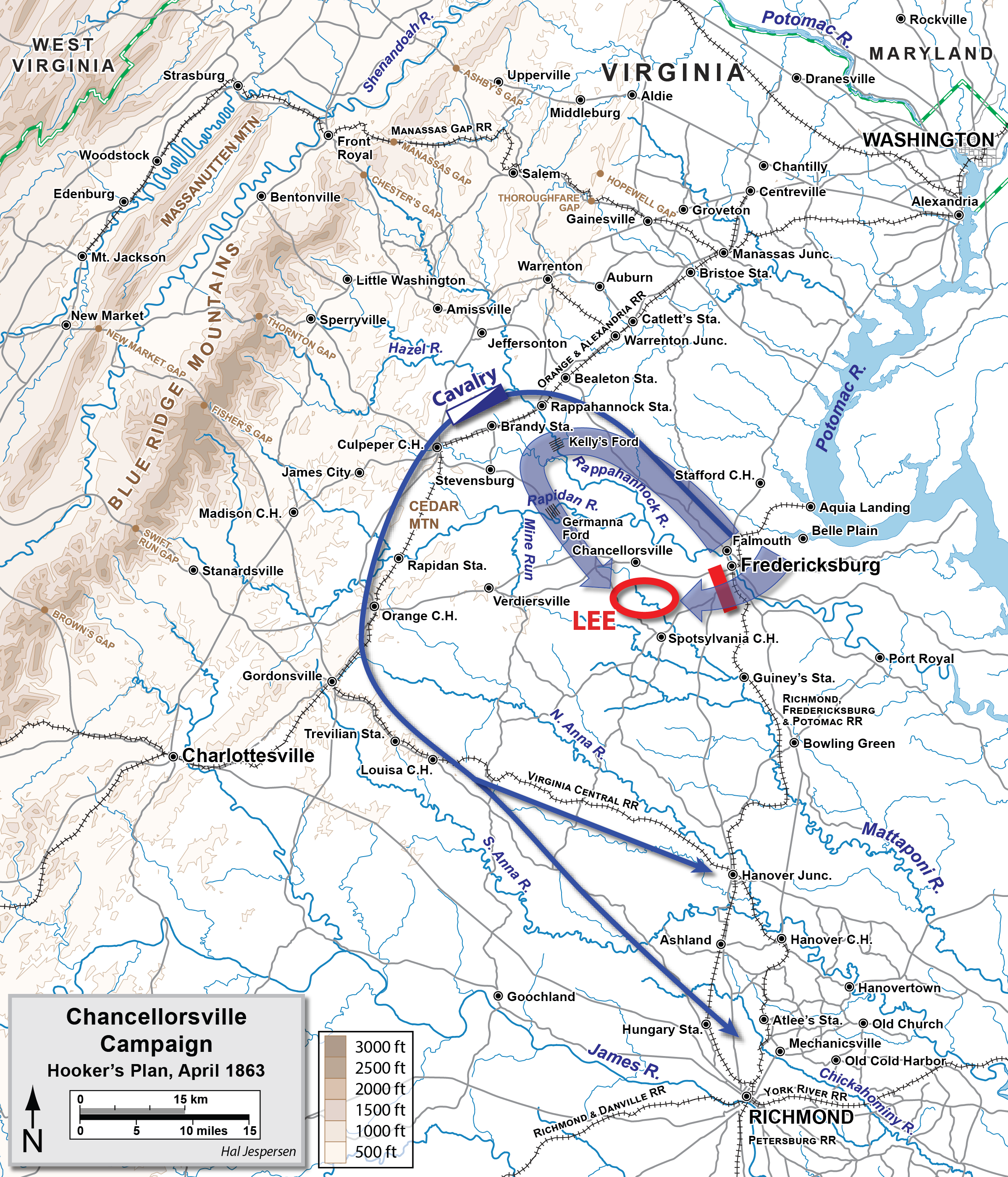
Hooker's plan for Stoneman's 1863 Raid during the Chancellorsville campaign Confederate Union

== Stoneman's Raid ==
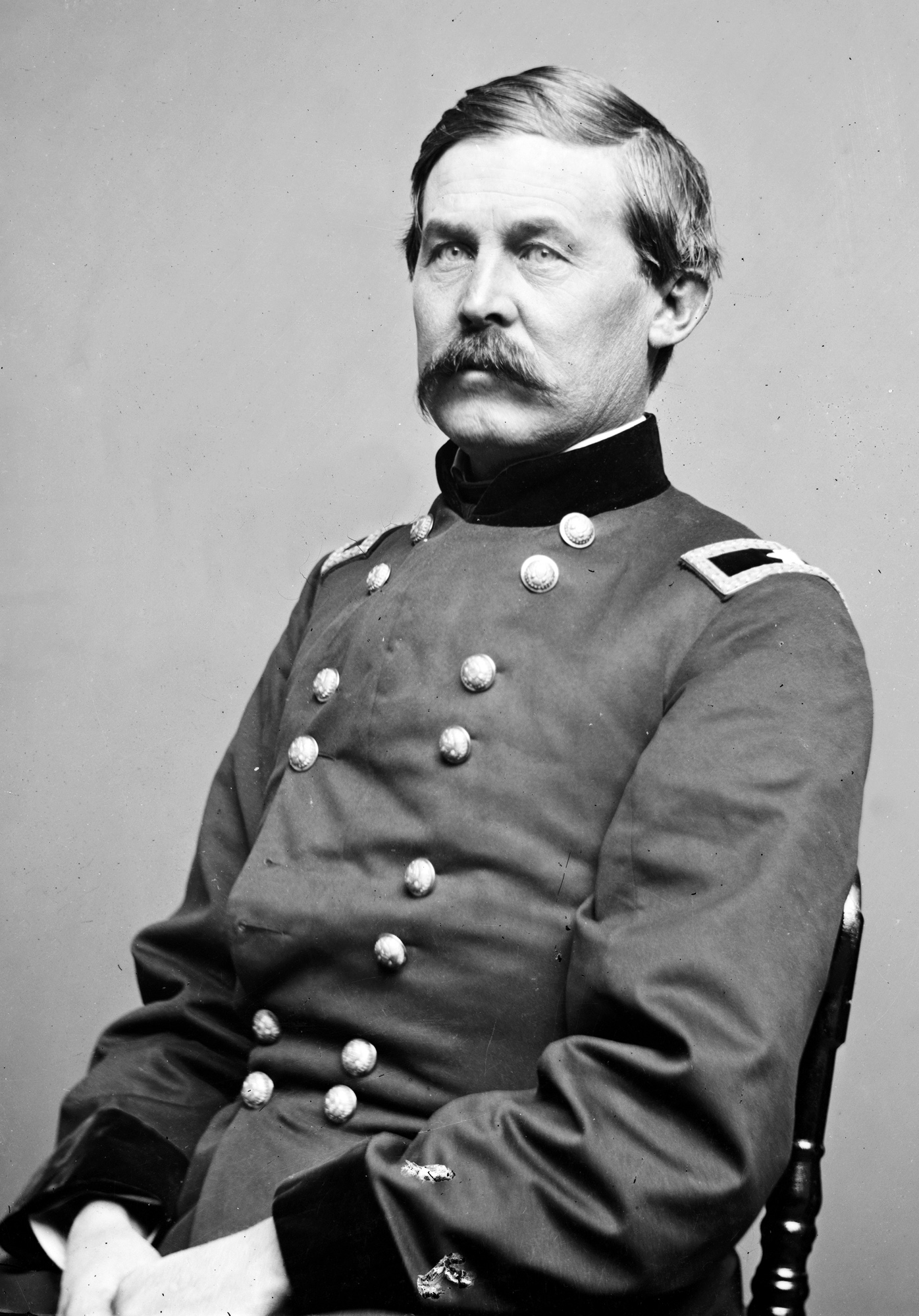
General John Buford 1863

During April 29 and 30, elements of Buford's cavalry scoured the countryside seeking suitable river crossings and skirmishing with Rebel pickets. The conditions and the weather deteriorated with the men's rations becoming sodden and since campfires were forbidden lest they reveal the raider's location, the cavalryman's uniforms were rarely dry. The plight of the horses was even worse; dead and crippled animals marked the route of Stoneman's march. By May 2, Buford's brigade camped alone on the south bank of the North Anna river—he had led his men almost halfway to the Confederate capital at Richmond and could begin his task of destroying the local infrastructure in earnest.

On May 2 Captain Myles Keogh accompanied British born Lieutenant Walker's C Company, Fifth U.S cavalry, in a raid that captured a 15 wagon strong supply train at Thompson's Cross Roads. Keogh personally arranged for the captured mules, 60 in all, to be distributed to the men whose horses had gone lame. At Louisa, Captain Lord, with his regiment, the First Cavalry, was also detached toward Tolersville and Frederickshall, to destroy the railroad and to burn the bridge over the North Anna, on the road from Fredericksburg.

On May 4, a Captain Harrison with the remainder of the Fifth U.S. cavalry engaged Confederate cavalry for the first time in the raid, led by Robert E. Lee's son, Rooney Lee. In his own report of that event, Captain James E. Harrison gives his account of facing a force vastly superior in number to his own:

Upon the arrival of Lieutenant Urban, I joined his party to the main force, making 30 in all. After the guidon-bearers had fallen out, and finding the rebel force still advancing at a charge, and several of my scouts and pickets still out, I made up my mind to charge them, with the hope of checking them for a short time, to enable my pickets to return and to get my led animals off. When they came in sight of my command, they commenced to slacken their speed, feeling somewhat uncertain as to the strength of my force. I took advantage of that moment and charged. As soon as they saw the end of my column, they also sounded the charge, and we met just at the point of the woods where the road comes out on to an open space of about an acre. I found that I had become engaged with at least 1,000 men. The shock of the charge was so great that my foremost horses were completely knocked over. I fought them as long as I deemed prudent, and, finding that I was overpowered by numbers, I wheeled about and retreated on the road to Yanceyville...

By May 5, only 646 of the brigade's horses were deemed fit to continue. Using these mounts, Buford, by necessity, returned to Louisa and Gordonsville only to find their destructive work of three days previous partly repaired. Buford's men set about their destructive task again. There at nightfall they met and evaded a strong contingent of Confederate infantry and cannon, although briefly, one trooper admitted, "it looked...as if our time had come."

Buford's return towards Gordonsville was also ordered as a ruse to mask the return of the main body of Stoneman's cavalry to Hooker's command. Colonel George B. Sandford would later write: "Buford was the man of all others to be entrusted with such an undertaking." For three days and nights, Buford's exhausted men remained on the move and such was the trooper's fatigue that dozens of men fell asleep in the saddles of their emaciated, sore backed horses. Even now, as the mission was nearing completion, ended by the Union retreat from its defeat at Chancellorsville, Buford's column was still battling the swollen rivers and streams.

From May 6, when they regrouped with Stoneman, to the 10th, Buford's men made their way slowly back to HQ at Falmouth where they returned to picket duty and recovered from the previous weeks exertions. Buford's enterprise provided one of the few bright moments in what was a less damaging campaign than expected, although the Northern press hailed the incursion in glowing terms.

== Postscript ==
During the Chancellorsville Campaign, Stoneman accomplished little and Hooker considered him one of the principal reasons for the Union defeat at Chancellorsville. Hooker needed to deflect criticism from himself and relieved Stoneman from his cavalry command, sending him back to Washington, D.C., for medical treatment (chronic hemorrhoids, exacerbated by cavalry service), where in July he became a Chief of the U.S. Cavalry Bureau, a desk job.

Buford was soon elevated to the command of a cavalry division but was quick to laud the performances of his seven staff in his official report of the raid:

All of my staff-Captains [Myles W.] Keogh, [Joseph] O'Keeffe, and [Theodore C.] Bacon; Lieutenants [John] Mix, Peter Penn Gaskell, [Philip] Dwyer, and [William] Dean—have been severely worked, and have rendered valuable service to me. Untiring and zealous, they have relieved me of much anxiety, and have promoted good feeling through the brigade.

Regardless of the success or failure of the daring operation, what it did install was a growing sense of confidence among the men of the Federal cavalry. While Captain Merritt of the 1st Maine may be slightly overstating the legacy of that campaign when he termed it—"one of the most remarkable achievements in the history of modern warfare"—one of his troopers probably best summed up the new-found confidence when he recorded:

It was ever after a matter of pride with the boys that they were on Stoneman's Raid.
