= List of orders of battle =

This is a list of orders of battle, which list the known military units that were located within the field of operations for a battle or campaign. The battles are listed in chronological order by starting date (or planned start date).

== Classical period ==
Battle or campaign	Order of battle	Date
Battle of Red Cliffs	Cao Cao's forces and Allied forces	Winter of 208/9 AD

== Early modern period ==
Battle or campaign	Order of battle	Date
Crusades
Battle of Lepanto	Holy League and Ottoman fleets	October 7, 1571
Thirty Years' War
First Battle of Breitenfeld	Holy Roman Empire, Catholic League, Sweden, and Saxony	September 17, 1631
Battle of Rain	Sweden and the Catholic League	April 15, 1632
Second Battle of Breitenfeld	Holy Roman Empire, Saxony, and Sweden	October 23, 1642
Battle of Rocroi	French and Spanish armies	May 19, 1643
English Civil War
Battle of Marston Moor	Covenanter, Parliamentarians, and Royalists	July 2, 1644
Battle of Naseby	Parliamentarians and Royalists	June 14, 1645
Second Anglo-Dutch War
Battle of Lowestoft	British and Dutch fleets	June 13, 1665
Great Turkish War
Battle of Vienna	Christian Coalition and Ottoman armies	September 12, 1683
War of the Spanish Succession
Battle of Schellenberg	Allied and Franco-Bavarian armies	July 2, 1704
Battle of Blenheim	Allied and Franco-Bavarian armies	August 13, 1704
Great Northern War
Battle of Lesnaya	Russian and Swedish armies	October 9, 1708
Austro-Turkish War of 1716–18
Battle of Petrovaradin	Austrian and Ottoman armies	August 5, 1716
War of the Austrian Succession
Battle of Toulon	British and Franco-Spanish fleets	February 21–22, 1744
Jacobite uprisings
Battle of Culloden	Jacobite and Government armies	April 16, 1746
French and Indian War
Battle of the Monongahela	British and French forces	July 9, 1755
Seven Years' War
Battle of Minden	Allied and French forces	August 1, 1759
American Revolutionary War
Battle of Long Island	American and British armies	August 27, 1776
Battle of Trenton	American and British armies	December 26, 1776
Battle of Brandywine	American and British armies	September 11, 1777
Battle of Paoli	American and British armies	September 21, 1777
Battle of Germantown	American and British armies	October 4, 1777
Battle of Bemis Heights	American and British armies	October 7, 1777
Battle of Monmouth	American and British armies	June 28, 1778
Penobscot Expedition	American and British fleets	July 24 – August 16, 1779
Battle of Camden	American and British armies	August 16, 1780
Battle of Cowpens	American and British armies	January 17, 1781
Battle of Guilford Court House	American and British armies	March 15, 1781
Battle of the Chesapeake	British and French fleets	September 5, 1781
Siege of Yorktown	American, French, and British armies	September 28 – October 17, 1781
Battle of the Saintes	British and French fleets	April 12, 1782
Battle of Cape Spartel	British and Franco-Spanish fleets	October 20, 1782
Russo-Swedish War (1788–1790)
Battle of Reval	Russian and Swedish fleets	May 13, 1790

== 1792–1860 ==
Battle or campaign	Order of battle	Date
French Revolutionary Wars
Battle of Jemappes	French and Austrian armies	November 6, 1792
Siege of Toulon	French fleet	August 29 – December 19, 1793
Battle of Tourcoing	French and Coalition armies	May 17–18, 1794
Glorious First of June	British and French fleets	June 1, 1794
Martin's cruise	British and French fleets	June 1794
Battle of Fleurus	French and Austrian-Dutch armies	June 26, 1794
Campaign of the Great Winter	British and French fleets	December 24, 1794 – February 3, 1795
Battle of Genoa (1795)	British and French fleets	March 13–14, 1795
Biscay campaign of June 1795	British and French fleets	June, 1795
Battle of Quiberon	French Republican and Anglo-Royalist forces	June 23 – July 21, 1795
Battle of Monte Settepani	French and Austro-Sardinian armies	June 24 – July 7, 1795
Battle of the Hyères Islands	British and French fleets	July 13, 1795
Battle of Loano	French and Austrian-Sardinian armies	November 23–24, 1795
Montenotte campaign	French and Austrian-Sardinian armies	April 12, 1796
Battle of Castiglione	French and Austrian armies	August 5, 1796
Battle of Bassano	French and Austrian armies	September 8, 1796
Battle of Arcola	French and Austrian armies	November 15–17, 1796
French expedition to Ireland (1796)	French fleet	December 1796
Battle of Rivoli	French and Austrian armies	January 14–15, 1797
Battle of Cape St. Vincent	British and Spanish fleets	February 14, 1797
Battle of Camperdown	British and Dutch fleets	October 11, 1797
Battle of the Nile	British and French fleets	August 1 – 3, 1798
Battle of Tory Island	British and French fleets	October 12, 1798
Egyptian campaign	French Army	1798–1799
Army of the Danube	French order of battle	March 1, 1799
Battle of Stockach	French and Austrian armies	March 25, 1799
Bruix' Expedition of 1799	British and Franco-Spanish fleets	April – August 1799
Siege of Genoa	French and Coalition forces	April – June 4, 1800
Battle of Messkirch	French Army	May 4–5, 1800
Battle of Marengo	French and Austrian armies	June 14, 1800
Battle of Hohenlinden	French and Austrian armies	December 3, 1800
Algeciras campaign	British and Franco-Spanish fleets	June 13, 1801 – July 14, 1801
Napoleonic Wars
Battle of Cape Finisterre	British and Franco-Spanish fleets	July 22, 1805
Battle of Trafalgar	British and Franco-Spanish fleets	October 21, 1805
Battle of Caldiero (1805)	French and Austrian armies	October 30, 1805
Battle of Dürenstein	French, Austrian, and Russian	November 11, 1805
Battle of Wischau	French and Russian armies	November 25, 1805
Battle of Austerlitz	French, Austrian, and Russian	December 2, 1805
Atlantic campaign of 1806	French and British fleets	December 1805 – September 1806
Battle of San Domingo	British and French fleets	February 6, 1806
Battle of Maida	British and French armies	July 4, 1806
Battle of Saalfeld	French and Prussian-Saxon armies	October 10, 1806
Battle of Jena–Auerstedt	French and Prussian-Saxon armies	October 14, 1806
Battle of Eylau	France, Russia, and Prussia	February 7–8, 1807
Battle of Friedland	Franco-allied and Russian forces	June 14, 1807
Gunboat War	Royal Dano-Norwegian Navy in Norway	1808
Battle of Vimeiro	British-Portuguese and French	August 20, 1808
Cardedeu campaign	French and Spanish armies	June – December, 1808
Tyrolean Rebellion	Austrian and Bavarian armies	1809
Battle of Uclés	French and Spanish armies	January 13, 1809
Battle of Corunna	British and French armies	January 16, 1809
Battle of the Basque Roads	British and French fleets	April 11–25, 1809
Battle of Sacile	Austrian and Franco-Italian armies	April 15–16, 1809
Battle of Abensberg	Austrian and French armies	April 20, 1809
Battle of Piave River	Austrian and French-Italian armies	May 8, 1809
Battle of Aspern-Essling	Austrian and French armies	May 21–22, 1809
Battle of Wagram	Austrian and Franco-Allied armies	July 5–6, 1809
Battle of Talavera	British, French and Spanish armies	July 27–28, 1809
Battle of Bussaco	French and Anglo-Portuguese armies	September 27, 1810
Battle of Barrosa	French and Anglo-Allied armies	March 5, 1811
Battle of Fuentes de Oñoro	French and Anglo-Allied armies	May 3–5, 1811
Battle of Albuera	French and Anglo-Allied armies	May 16, 1811
Battle of Saguntum; Siege of Valencia (1812)	French and Spanish armies	October 25, 1811; December 26, 1811 - January 9, 1812
Imperial Russian Army	Russian Army order of battle	1812
French invasion of Russia	French and Russian armies	June 24 – December 14, 1812
Battle of Salamanca	French and Anglo-Portuguese armies	July 22, 1812
Battle of Vitoria	French and Anglo-Allied armies	June 21, 1813
Battle of Wartenburg	French and Prussian armies	October 3, 1813
Battle of Hanau	French, Austrian, and Bavarian armies	October 30–31, 1813
Dano-Swedish War	Dano-Allied and Sixth Coalition forces	1813–1814
Battle of La Rothière	French and Allied armies	February 1, 1814
Six Days' Campaign	French, Prussian, and Russian armies	February 10–15, 1814
Battle of Orthez	French and Anglo-Allied armies	February 27, 1814
Battle of Toulouse	France and Anglo-Allied	April 10, 1814
Battle of Tolentino	Austrian and Neapolitan armies	May 2–3, 1815
Hundred Days	First French Empire and the Seventh Coalition	March 10 – July 8, 1815
Battle of Quatre Bras	France and Anglo-Allied	June 16, 1815
Battle of Ligny	French and Prussians	June 16, 1815
Waterloo campaign	French, Anglo-Allied, and Prussian	June 16–18, 1815
Russo-Turkish War (1806–1812)
Battle of Athos	Russian and Ottoman navies	July 1, 1807
War of 1812
Battle of Tippecanoe	US Army, State Militias and Tecumseh's Confederacy	November 7, 1811
Siege of Fort Meigs	American and British forces and Tecumseh's Confederacy	April 28 - May 9, 1813
Battle of Fort George	American and British forces	May 25, 1813
Second Battle of Sacket's Harbor	American and British forces	May 28–29, 1813
Battle of Lake Erie	American and British naval squadrons	September 10, 1813
Battle of the Chateauguay	American and British armies	October 26, 1813
Battle of Crysler's Farm	American and British armies	November 11, 1813
Battle of Lundy's Lane	American and British Armies	July 25, 1814
Battle of Plattsburgh	American and British naval squadrons	September 11, 1814
Battle of New Orleans	American forces and British forces	January 8, 1815
Argentine War of Independence
Battle of Huaqui	Independist and Spanish Royalist forces	June 20, 1811
Bolivian War of Independence
Battle of Sipe-Sipe	Independist and Spanish Royalist forces	November 28, 1815
Barbary Wars
Bombardment of Algiers	British, Dutch, and Algerian Navies	August 27, 1816
Chilean War of Independence
Battle of Cancha Rayada	Independist and Spanish Royalist forces	March 19, 1818
Battle of Maipú	Independist and Spanish Royalist forces	April 5, 1818
Venezuelan War of Independence
Battle of La Hogaza	Patriot and Spanish Royalist forces	December 2, 1817
Battle of Carabobo	Patriot and Spanish Royalist forces	June 24, 1821
Ecuadorian War of Independence
Battle of Pichincha	Independist and Spanish Royalist forces	May 24, 1822
Peruvian War of Independence
Battle of Junín	Independist and Spanish Royalist forces	August 6, 1824
Battle of Ayacucho	Independist and Spanish Royalist forces	December 9, 1824
War of the Confederation
Battle of Yungay	Confederation army and Chilean-Peruvian army	January 20, 1839
Anglo-Bruneian War
Anglo-Bruneian War	British and Bruneian forces	August 19, 1845 – December 24, 1846
Mexican–American War
Battle of Palo Alto	American and Mexican armies	May 8, 1846
Siege of Veracruz	American and Mexican armies	March 9–29, 1847
Battle of Cerro Gordo	American and Mexican armies	April 17–18, 1847
Battle for Mexico City	American and Mexican armies	September 8–15, 1847
Crimean War
Battle of Balaclava	British, French, and Russian armies	October 25, 1854
Second War of Italian Independence
Battle of Solferino	French, Sardinian, and Austrian armies	June 24, 1859

== American Civil War ==
Battle or campaign	Order of battle	Date
1861
Battle of Big Bethel	Confederate Hampton Division and Union Department of Virginia	June 10, 1861
Battle of Hoke's Run	Union Army of the Shenandoah	July 2, 1861
Battle of Carthage (1861)	Confederate Missouri State Guard and Union Department of Missouri	July 5, 1861
Battle of Rich Mountain	Confederate Army of the Northwest and Union Department of the Ohio	July 11, 1861
First Battle of Bull Run	Confederate Army of the Potomac and Army of the Shenandoah and Union Department of Northeast Virginia	July 21, 1861
Battle of Wilson's Creek	Confederate Western Army and Missouri State Guard and Union Army of the West	August 10, 1861
Battle of Carnifex Ferry	Confederate Forces and Union Army of West Virginia	September 10, 1861
Battle of Cheat Mountain	Confederate Army of the Northwest and Union Cheat Mountain District	September 12–15, 1861
Battle of Ball's Bluff	Confederate Army of the Potomac and Union Army of the Potomac	October 20–24, 1861
Battle of Camp Wildcat	Confederate brigade, Army of the Northwest and Union Department of the Ohio	October 21, 1861
Battle of Belmont	Confederate First Division, Western Department & Units in reserve or near Columbus and US Grant's Expeditionary Command, Union District of Southeast Missouri & Units subject to Grant's command	November 7, 1861
1862
Battle of Mill Springs	Confederate District of East Tennessee and Union Department of the Ohio	January 19, 1862
Battle of Roanoke Island	Confederate Dist. of Roanoke & "Mosquito Fleet" and Union Coast Division & North Atlantic Blockading Squadron	February 7–8, 1862
Battle of Fort Donelson	Confederate Department No. 2 and Union Army of West Tennessee	February 11–16, 1862
Battle of Island Number Ten	Confederate Department No. 2 and Union Army of the Mississippi & Western Flotilla	February 28, 1862 – April 8, 1862
Battle of Pea Ridge	Confederate Army of the West and Union Army of the Southwest	March 7–8, 1862
Battle of Hampton Roads	Confederate CSS Virginia & James River Squadron and Union North Atlantic Blockading Squadron	March 8–9, 1862
Battle of New Bern	Confederate Pamlico District and Coast Division of the US Army	March 14, 1862
Battle of Kernstown I	Confederate Valley District and Union 1st Division, V Corps, Army of the Potomac	March 23, 1862
Battle of Glorieta Pass	Confederate Army of New Mexico and Union Department of New Mexico	March 26–28, 1862
Beginning of the Peninsula campaign	Confederate Army of Northern Virginia & Other Troops in the Department of Northern Virginia and Union Army of the Potomac, Other Troops from the Department of the Potomac & Union Department of Virginia	April 4–30, 1862
Battle of Shiloh	Confederate Army of Mississippi and Union Army of the Tennessee and Army of the Ohio	April 6–7, 1862
Siege of Corinth	Confederate Army of Mississippi and Union Department of the Mississippi	April 29 – May 30, 1862
Battle of Williamsburg	Confederate Army of Northern Virginia and Union Army of the Potomac	May 5, 1862
Battle of McDowell	Confederate District of the Valley Army and Army of the Northwest and Union Mountain Department	May 8–9, 1862
First Battle of Winchester	Confederate District of the Valley and Union Department of the Shenandoah	May 25, 1862
Battle of Hanover Court House	Confederate Army of Northern Virginia and Union Army of the Potomac	May 27, 1862
Battle of Seven Pines	Confederate Army of Northern Virginia and Union Army of the Potomac	May 31 – June 1, 1862
Battle of Cross Keys	Confederate District of the Valley and Union Mountain Department and Department of the Rappahannock	June 8, 1862
Battle of Port Republic	Confederate District of the Valley and Union Department of the Rappahannock	June 9, 1862
Seven Days Battles	Confederate Army of Northern Virginia and Union Army of the Potomac	June 25 – July 1, 1862
Battle of Cotton Plant	Confederate forces and Union Army of the Southwest	July 7, 1862
Battle of Baton Rouge	Confederate and Union forces	August 5, 1862
Battle of Cedar Mountain	Confederate Left wing, Army of Northern Virginia and Union I Corps, Army of Virginia	August 9, 1862
Battle of Richmond	Confederate Army of Kentucky and Union Provisional Army of Kentucky	August 29–30, 1862
Second Battle of Bull Run	Confederate Army of Northern Virginia and Union Army of Virginia and detachments, Army of the Potomac	August 29–30, 1862
Battle of Chantilly	Confederate Left wing, Army of Northern Virginia and Union III and IV Corps, Army of the Potomac	September 1, 1862
Battle of Antietam	Confederate Army of Northern Virginia and Union Army of the Potomac	September 17, 1862
Battle of Iuka	Confederate Army of the West and Union Army of the Mississippi	September 19, 1862
Second Battle of Corinth	Confederate Army of West Tennessee and Union Army of the Mississippi	October 3–4, 1862
Battle of Perryville	Confederate Army of the Mississippi and Union Army of the Ohio	October 8, 1862
Battle of Prairie Grove	Confederate I Corps, Trans-Mississippi Army and Union Army of the Frontier	December 7, 1862
Battle of Fredericksburg	Confederate Army of Northern Virginia and Union Army of the Potomac	December 13, 1862
Battle of Chickasaw Bayou	Confederate Department of Mississippi and East Louisiana and Union Army of the Tennessee	December 26–29, 1862
Battle of Stones River	Confederate Army of Tennessee and Union Army of the Cumberland	December 31, 1862 – January 2, 1863
1863
Battle of Fort Hindman	Confederate Department of the Trans-Mississippi and Union Army of the Mississippi	January 9–11, 1863
Battle of Franklin (1863)	Union Army of Kentucky and Confederate Cavalry Corps, Army of Tennessee	April 10, 1863
Siege of Suffolk	Confederate Department of North Carolina and Southern Virginia and Union Department of Virginia & VII Corps and North Atlantic Blockading Squadron	April 11 – May 4, 1863
Battle of Chancellorsville	Confederate Army of Northern Virginia and Union Army of the Potomac	May 1–4, 1863
Battle of Raymond	Confederate Department of Mississippi and East Louisiana and Union Army of the Tennessee	May 12, 1863
Battle of Champion Hill	Confederate Department of Mississippi and East Louisiana and Union Army of the Tennessee	May 16, 1863
Battle of Vicksburg	Confederate Army of Mississippi and Union Army of the Tennessee	May 18 – July 4, 1863
Siege of Port Hudson	Confederate Department of Mississippi & East Louisiana and Union Army of the Gulf & West Gulf Blockading Squadron	May 22, 1863 – July 9, 1863
Battle of Brandy Station	Confederate Cavalry Division, Army of Northern Virginia and Union Cavalry Corps, Army of the Potomac	June 9, 1863
Battle of Winchester II	Confederate Second Corps, Army of Northern Virginia and Union 2nd Division, VIII Corps	June 13–15, 1863
Battle of Gettysburg	Confederate Army of North Virginia and Union Army of the Potomac	July 1–3, 1863
Battle of Helena	Confederate District of Arkansas and Union District of East Arkansas	July 4, 1863
Second Battle of Charleston Harbor	Confederate Dept. of South Carolina, Georgia & Florida and Union Department of the South & South Atlantic Blockading Squadron	July 19, 1863 – September 7, 1863
Little Rock campaign	Confederate District of Arkansas and Union Department of Arkansas	August 25 – September 10, 1863
Battle of White Sulphur Springs	Confederate and Union forces	August 26–27, 1863
Battle of the Cumberland Gap	Confederate and Union forces	September 7–9, 1863
Battle of Bayou Fourche	Confederate and Union forces	September 10, 1863
Battle of Chickamauga	Confederate Army of Tennessee and Union Army of the Cumberland	September 19–20, 1863
Bristoe campaign	Confederate Army of Northern Virginia and Union Army of the Potomac	October – November, 1863
Chattanooga campaign	Confederate Army of Tennessee and Union Army of the Cumberland	October – November, 1863
Battle of Wauhatchie	Confederate Army of Tennessee and Union Army of the Cumberland	October 28–29, 1863
Battle of Droop Mountain	Confederate and Union forces	November 6, 1863
Battle of Mine Run	Confederate Army of Northern Virginia and Union Army of the Potomac	November 27 – December 2, 1863
Knoxville campaign	Confederate First Corps, Army of Northern Virginia and Union Army of the Ohio	November 16 – December 13, 1863
1864
Meridian campaign	Confederate and Union forces	February 3 – March 6, 1864
Battle of Olustee	Confederate District of East Florida and Union District of Florida	February 20, 1864
Red River campaign	Confederate Trans-Mississippi Department and Union forces	March 10, 1864 – May 22, 1864
Camden Expedition	Confederate District of Arkansas, Trans-Mississippi Department and Union Department of Arkansas	March 23 – May 2, 1864
Battle of Plymouth	Confederate and Union forces	April 17–20, 1864
Battle of the Wilderness	Confederate Army of Northern Virginia and Union Army of the Potomac and IX Corps	May 5–7, 1864
Battle of Cloyd's Mountain	Confederate and Union forces	May 9, 1864
Atlanta campaign	Phase 1 - Confederate Army of Tennessee and Union Armies of the Cumberland, of the Ohio and of the Tennessee	May 7 – July 17, 1864
Atlanta campaign	Battle of Atlanta - Confederate Army of Tennessee and Union Army of the Tennessee	July 22, 1864
Atlanta campaign	Phase 2 - Confederate Army of Tennessee (second phase) and Union Armies of the Cumberland, of the Ohio and of the Tennessee (second phase)	July 17 - September 8, 1864
Battle of Spotsylvania Court House	Confederate Army of Northern Virginia and Union Army of the Potomac and IX Corps	May 8–21, 1864
Battle of Chester Station	Confederate and Union forces	May 10, 1864
Battle of New Market	Confederate Department of Western Virginia and Union Department of West Virginia	May 15, 1864
Battle of Dallas	Confederate Army of Tennessee and Union Army of the Tennessee	May 26 – June 1, 1864
Battle of Cold Harbor	Confederate Army of Northern Virginia and Union Army of the Potomac	May 31 – June 12, 1864
Battle of Piedmont	Confederate Department of Southwest Virginia and East Tennessee and Union Department of West Virginia	June 5, 1864
Siege of Petersburg	Confederate Army of Northern Virginia and Department of Richmond and Union Army of the Potomac and Army of the James	June 9, 1864 – March 25, 1865
Battle of Trevilian Station	Confederate Army of Northern Virginia Cavalry Corps and Union Army of the Potomac Cavalry Corps	June 11, 1864 – June 12, 1864
Second Battle of Petersburg	Confederate Army of Northern Virginia and Union Armies of the Potomac and the James	June 15–18, 1864
Battle of Lynchburg	Confederate and Union forces	June 17–18, 1864
Battle of Monocacy Junction	Confederate Army of the Valley District and Union Middle Department	July 9, 1864
Battle of Fort Stevens	Confederate Army of the Valley District and Union Department of Washington	July 11–12, 1864
Battle of Tupelo	Confederate and Union forces	July 14–15, 1864
Battle of Peachtree Creek	Confederate Army of Tennessee and Union Army of the Cumberland	July 20, 1864
Battle of Kernstown II	Confederate Army of the Valley District and Union Army of West Virginia	July 24, 1864
First Battle of Deep Bottom	Confederate Army of Northern Virginia and Union Armies of the Potomac and the James	July 27–29, 1864
Battle of the Crater	Confederate Army of Northern Virginia and Union Armies of the Potomac and the James	July 30, 1864
Battle of Moorefield	Confederate and Union armies	August 7, 1864
Second Battle of Deep Bottom	Confederate Army of Northern Virginia and Union Army of the Potomac	August 14–20, 1864
Battle of Globe Tavern	Confederate Army of Northern Virginia and Union Army of the Potomac	August 18–21, 1864
Battle of Mobile Bay	Confederate District of the Gulf & CSS Tennessee with gunboats and Union Military Division of West Mississippi & West Gulf Blocking Squadron	August 22–23, 1864
Second Battle of Ream's Station	Confederate Army of Northern Virginia and Union Army of the Potomac	August 25, 1864
Battle of Jonesborough	Confederate Army of Tennessee and Union Military Division of the Mississippi	August 30 – September 1, 1864
Battle of Opequon	Confederate Army of the Valley and Union Army of the Shenandoah	September 19, 1864
Battle of Chaffin's Farm	Confederate Army of Northern Virginia and Union Army of the James	September 29–30, 1864
Battle of Peebles's Farm	Confederate Army of Northern Virginia and Union Army of the Potomac	September 30 – October 2, 1864
Battle of Darbytown and New Market Roads	Confederate Army of Northern Virginia and Union Army of the James	October 7, 1864
Battle of Darbytown Road	Confederate Army of Northern Virginia and Union Army of the James	October 13, 1864
Battle of Cedar Creek	Confederate Army of the Valley and Union Army of the Shenandoah	October 19, 1864
Battle of Westport	Confederate Army of Missouri and Union Army of the Border, Army of the Department of Missouri, and XVI Corps	October 23, 1864
Battle of Mine Creek	Confederate Army of Missouri and Union Army of the Border	October 25, 1864
Battle of Boydton Plank Road	Confederate Third Corps, Army of Northern Virginia and Union Army of the Potomac	October 27–28, 1864
Battle of Fair Oaks & Darbytown Road	Confederate Army of Northern Virginia and Union Army of the James	October 27–28, 1864
Savannah campaign	Confederate Department of South Carolina, Georgia, and Florida and Union Armies of the Tennessee and of Georgia	November 15 – December 21, 1864
Second Battle of Franklin	Confederate Army of Tennessee and Union IV and XXIII Corps	November 30, 1864
Battle of Honey Hill	Confederate Military District of Georgia and Union Coastal Division, Department of the South	November 30, 1864
Battle of Nashville	Confederate Army of Tennessee and Union Army of the Cumberland	December 15–16, 1864
1865
Carolinas campaign	Confederate Army of Tennessee and Union Military Division of the Mississippi	January – April 1865
Second Battle of Fort Fisher	Confederate forces and Union Department of Virginia and North Carolina	January 13–15, 1865
Battle of Hatcher's Run	Confederate Army of Northern Virginia and Union Army of the Potomac	February 5–7, 1865
Battle of Wilmington	Confederate Department of North Carolina and Union Department of North Carolina, Wilmington Expeditionary Force	February 11–12, 1865
Battle of Wyse Fork	Confederate Department of North Carolina and Union Department of North Carolina	March 7–10, 1865
Battle of Bentonville	Confederate Army of the South and Union Grand Army of the West	March 19–21, 1865
Battle of Fort Stedman	Confederate Army of Northern Virginia and Union Army of the Potomac	March 25, 1865
Mobile campaign	Confederate District of the Gulf and Union Army of West Mississippi	March – April 1865
Appomattox campaign	Confederate Army of Northern Virginia and Union Army of the Potomac, Army of the James, and Army of the Shenandoah	March 29 – April 9, 1865
Battle of Five Forks	Confederate forces and Union Army of the Shenandoah	April 1, 1865
Battle of Fort Blakeley	Confederate Department of Mississippi, Alabama, and East Louisiana and Union Army of West Mississippi	April 2–9, 1865

== 1866–1913 ==
Battle or campaign	Order of battle	Date
Paraguayan War
Battle of Tuyutí	Armies of the Triple Alliance and Paraguay	May 24, 1866
Battle of Curupayty	Armies of the Triple Alliance and Paraguay	September 22, 1866
Battle of Ytororó	Brazilian and Paraguan armies	December 6, 1868
Austro-Prussian War
Battle of Königgrätz	Austrian and Prussian Armies	July 3, 1866
Franco-Prussian War
Franco-Prussian War	French and Prussian Armies	July – August 1870
British colonial campaigns
Lushai Expedition	British and Lushai forces	December 15, 1871 – February 20, 1872
War of the Pacific
Battle of San Francisco	Chilean and Peruvian-Bolivian armies	November 19, 1879
Battle of Tacna	Chilean North Operations Army, I Southern Peruvian Army, and Bolivian Army	May 26, 1880
Battle of Chorrillos	Chilean and Peruvian Armies	January 13, 1881
Serbian–Ottoman Wars
Serbian–Ottoman Wars (1876–1878)	Serbian Army	1876–1878
Russo-Turkish War (1877–78)
Russo-Turkish War (1877–78)	Ottoman Fleet	1877
Anglo-Zanzibar War
Anglo-Zanzibar War	British and Zanzibari forces	August 27, 1896
Spanish–American War
Battle of El Caney	US V Corps and Spanish IV Corps	July 1, 1898
Battle of San Juan Hill	US V Corps and Spanish IV Corps	July 1, 1898
Siege of Santiago	Cuban, US, and Spanish forces	July 3–17, 1898
Anglo–Boer Wars
Battle of Magersfontein	British and Boer forces	December 11, 1899
Russo-Japanese War
Battle of Tsushima	Russian Second and Third Pacific Squadrons and Japanese Combined Fleet	May 27–28, 1905
Italo-Turkish War
Italo-Turkish War	Ottoman fleet, October 1911	September 29, 1911 – October 18, 1912
First Balkan War
Balkan League	Bulgarian Army (1912), Bulgarian Army (1913), Serbian Army, Greek Army	October 1912 – May 1913
Ottoman Empire	Ottoman fleet	October 1912 – May 1913
Second Balkan War
Second Balkan War	Bulgarian Army	June – July 1913

== World War I ==
Battle or campaign	Order of battle	Date
Allies of World War I	Army of Belgium, British Expeditionary Force, British Cavalry Corps, 1914, Indian Army, 1914, Australian Army, French Army, Serbian Army, American Expeditionary Forces on the Western Front	August 1914
Central Powers of World War I	Army of the German Empire, 1914, Imperial German Navy, 1914 German Army, Western Front, 1918	August 1914
Battle of Tannenberg	German Eighth Army and Russian Northwest Front	August 17 – September 1, 1914
Battle of Mons	British Expeditionary Force and German First Army	August 23, 1914
First Battle of the Marne	British Expeditionary Force, French Army, and German Army	September 5–12, 1914
Australian occupation of German New Guinea	Australian Naval and Military Expeditionary Force and German Polizeitruppe	September – November, 1914
First Battle of Ypres	British Expeditionary Force, French Eighth Army, and German Fourth and Sixth Armies	October 19 – November 22, 1914
Battle of Łódź	German and Russian armies	November 11 – December 6, 1914
Battle of Dogger Bank	British and German Fleets	January 24, 1915
Gallipoli campaign	Allied and Ottoman forces	April 25, 1915 – 9 January 9, 1916
Egyptian Expeditionary Force	British, French, and Italian forces	March 10, 1916 – 1918
Battle of Jutland	British and German fleets	May 1916
Battle of the Somme	British, French and German forces	July 1 – November 18, 1916
Battle of Delville Wood	British and German forces	July 14 – 3 September 3, 1916
Desert Column	British forces	December 1916 – August, 1917
Battle of Vimy Ridge	Allied Canadian Corps and German Sixth Army	April 9–12, 1917
Battle of Caporetto	Italian Second Army and German/Austro-Hungarian Fourteenth Army	October 24 – November 19, 1917
Spring Offensive	British, French, and German armies	March 21 – July 18, 1918
Battle of Amiens	British Fourth, French First, and German Second and Eighteenth Armies	August 8, 1918
Battle of Megiddo (1918)	Allied and Ottoman armies	September 19 – October 1, 1918
Meuse-Argonne Offensive	American Expeditionary Force	September 26 – November 11, 1918
US air forces	American Expeditionary Force air service	November 1918

== Inter-war period ==
Battle or campaign	Order of battle	Date
Finnish Civil War
Finnish Civil War	Finnish whites and reds	January 1918 - May 1918
Polish-Soviet War
Polish-Soviet War	Polish Armed Forces and Soviet Armed Forces	February 1919 – March 1921
Greco-Turkish War (1919–1922)
Battle of Sakarya	Greek Army of Asia Minor and Turkish Western Front	August 23 – September 13, 1921
Battle of Dumlupınar	Greek Army of Asia Minor and Turkish Western Front	August 26–30, 1922
Second Italo-Abyssinian War
Second Italo-Abyssinian War	Italian Army and Ethiopian Army	October 1935 – May 1937
Spanish Civil War
Battle of Guadalajara	Italian Corpo Truppe Volontarie and Republican IV Corps	March 8–23, 1937
International Brigades	International Brigades	September 18, 1936 – September 23, 1938
Chinese Civil War
Chinese Civil War	Communist and Nationalist Forces	1927 – 1937 (first phase); 1945 – 1950 (second phase)
Second Sino-Japanese War
January 28 Incident	Japanese Shanghai Expeditionary Army and Chinese Shanghai Front	January 28 – March 3, 1932
Operation Nekka / Defense of the Great Wall	Japanese and Manchukuoan Forces and Chinese Forces	January 1 – May 31, 1933
Actions in Inner Mongolia	Chinese, Japanese, and Manchurian forces	April 1933 – December 1936
Suiyuan campaign (1936)	Japanese Inner Mongolian Army and Chinese Suiyuan Provincial Forces	October – November, 1936
Battle of Beiping-Tianjin	Japanese First Army and Second Fleet and Chinese 29th Army	Early July – early August, 1937
Operation Chahar	Japanese Peiping Railway Garrison Force, Kwantung Army, and Chahar Expeditionary Force	August 1937
Beiping–Suiyuan Railway Operation	Chinese Taiyuan Pacification Headquarters	August 1937
Tianjin–Pukou Railway Operation	Japanese 2nd Army and Chinese 1st Army Group	August – November 1937
Beiping–Hankou Railway Operation	Chinese and Japanese forces	August – December 1937
Battle of Shanghai	Japanese and Chinese forces	August 13 – November 26, 1937
Battle of Taiyuan	Japanese North China Front Army and Chinese 2nd War Area	September 1 – November 9, 1937
Battle of Pingxingguan	Japanese Army and Chinese 1st Route Army	September 24 – 25, 1937
Battle of Xuzhou	Chinese and Japanese forces	December 1937 – May 1938
Battle of Northern and Eastern Henan	Japanese North China Front Army and Chinese 1st War Area	January – June, 1938
Battle of Lanfeng	Japanese First Army and Chinese First War Area	May 1938
Amoy Operation	Japanese Fifth Fleet and Chinese Amoy Area	May 10–12, 1938
Battle of Wuhan	Chinese and Japanese forces	June 11 – October 27, 1938
Canton Operation	Japanese 21st Army and Chinese 12th Army Group	October – December, 1938
Hainan Island Operation	Japanese Hainan Conquest Forces and Chinese forces	February 10, 1939
Battle of Nanchang	Chinese and Japanese forces	March 17 – May 9, 1939
Swatow Operation	Japanese Fifth Fleet and Chinese forces	June 21 – 27, 1939
First Battle of Changsha	Chinese 9th War Area and Japanese 11th Army	September – October, 1939
Battle of South Guangxi	Japanese and Chinese forces	November 15–30, 1939
Battle of Zaoyang-Yichang	Japanese 11th Army and Chinese 5th War Area	May 1 – June 18, 1940
Hundred Regiments Offensive	Japanese North China Area Army and Chinese 8th Route Army	August 20 – December 5, 1940
Central Hubei Operation	Japanese 11th Army and Chinese 5th War Area	November 25–30, 1940
Battle of South Henan	Chinese and Japanese forces	January 30 – March 1, 1941
China Burma India Theater	Chinese Expeditionary Force (Burma)	Late February 1942
Zhejiang-Jiangxi campaign	Chinese and Japanese forces	May – September, 1942
Battle of Changde	Japanese 11th Army and Chinese 6th and 9th War Areas	November 2 – December 20, 1943
Battle of West Henan–North Hubei	Japanese Northern and Western Honan Command and Chinese 1st and 5th War Areas	March 21 – May 11, 1945
Second Guangxi campaign	Chinese and Japanese forces	April – August, 1945
Slovak–Hungarian War
Slovak–Hungarian War	Slovak and Hungarian forces	March 23, 1939 – March 31, 1939
Winter War
Winter War	Finnish Army	November 30, 1939 – March 13, 1940

== World War II ==
Battle or campaign	Order of battle	Date
European Theater of Operations
Polish campaign	German Army, Polish Army, and Soviet Army	September 1939
Norwegian campaign	Allies and German	April 1940
Battle of Belgium	French First Army Group, Belgian Army, and German Army Group B	May 10 – 28, 1940
Battle of France	Allies and Axis	May 10, 1940
Operation Sea Lion	German	September 1940 (planned)
Balkans campaign	German forces Axis order of battle for the invasion of Yugoslavia; Yugoslav order of battle prior to the invasion of Yugoslavia	April 6 – May 3, 1941
Battle of Crete	Commonwealth, Greek and Axis forces	May 20 – June 1, 1941
Operation Barbarossa	Axis and Soviet Forces	June 22, 1941
Leningrad Strategic Defensive	Order of battle for the Leningrad Strategic Defensive Operation	July 10, 1941 – September 30, 1941
Convoy PQ 17	Allied and German Navies	July, 1942
Dieppe Raid	Allied and German	August 1942
Convoy PQ 18	Allied and German forces	September 2–21, 1942
Battle of Stalingrad	Axis and Soviet	September 1942 – February 2, 1943
Battle of Kursk	German and Soviet	July 4–20, 1943
Battle of the Korsun–Cherkassy Pocket	German and Soviet forces	January 24, 1944 – February 16, 1944
Odessa Offensive	German and Soviet forces	March 26, 1944 – April 14, 1944
Operation Tungsten	Allied	April 3, 1944
First Battle of Târgu Frumos	Axis and Soviet forces	April 9–12, 1944
Battle of Anzio	Allied and German Forces	January 22 – June 5, 1944
American airborne landings in Normandy	US VII Corps and IX Troop Carrier Command and German Seventh Army	June 6, 1944
Juno Beach	British-Canadian Second Army and German detachments	June 6, 1944
Normandy landings	US and UK naval forces, British Second Army and US First Army	June 6, 1944
Operation Perch	British and German	June 6–19, 1944
Battle of Villers-Bocage	British and German	June 13, 1944
Operation Epsom	British and German	June 26–30, 1944
Operation Mascot	Allied	July 17, 1944
Operation Goodwood	British and German	July 18–20, 1944
Operation Cobra	US and German	July 25–31, 1944
Lorraine campaign	US Third Army and German Army Group G	September 1 – December 1, 1944
Operation Market Garden	Allied and German	September 17–25, 1944
Battle of the Scheldt	Allied and German	October 2–November 8, 1944
Battle of Debrecen	Axis and Soviet	October 1944
Battle of the Bulge	Allied and German	December 16, 1944 – January 25, 1945
Operation Northwind	Allied and German	December 31, 1944– January 25, 1945
Battle of Berlin - operations in and around the city	German and Soviet	April 16 – May 2, 1945
Battle in Berlin - fighting within the city	German and Soviet	April 23 – May 2, 1945
Mediterranean and Middle East Theatre
East African campaign	British (and Commonwealth) and Italian ground and naval forces	June 1940 – November 1941
Battle of Keren	British and French forces, Italian forces	February 5 – April 1, 1941
Iraq, Northern Syria and Iran	British (and Commonwealth) forces (Iraqforce, Paiforce, Persia and Iraq Command)	April 1941 – March 1943
Operation Brevity	British (and Commonwealth), German and Italian ground forces	May 15–16, 1941
Battle of Crete	British (and Commonwealth), German and Italian ground and naval forces	May 20 – June 1, 1941
Syria–Lebanon campaign	British, Commonwealth and Free French ground forces, Vichy French ground forces	June 8 – July 14, 1941
Operation Battleaxe	British (and Commonwealth), German and Italian ground forces	June 15–17, 1941
Operation Crusader	British (and Commonwealth), German and Italian ground forces	November 18 – December 30, 1941
Operation Pedestal	Allied and Axis forces	August 3 – August 15, 1942
Battle of Alam el Halfa	British (and Commonwealth), German and Italian ground forces	August 30 – September 5, 1942
Second Battle of El Alamein	British Eighth Army, Panzerarmee Afrika, Italian Army Africa	October 24 – November 4, 1942
Operation Torch	Allied and Axis forces	November 8–16, 1942
Sicily campaign	Allies and Axis	July – August, 1943
Allied invasion of Italy	Allied 15th Army Group and German Tenth Army	September 3–16, 1943
Operation Avalanche	Allied naval forces and Italo-German forces	September 9, 1943
Moro River campaign	Allied Eighth Army and German LXXVI Panzer Corps	December 6–31, 1943
First Battle of Monte Cassino	Allied 5th Army and German Tenth Army	January 17 – February 11, 1944
Battle of Anzio	Allied 5th Army and German Fourteenth Army	January 22 – June 5, 1944
Second Battle of Monte Cassino	New Zealand Corps and German XIV Panzer Corps	February 13–18, 1944
Fourth battle of Monte Cassino and the battle for Rome (Operation Diadem)	Allied 15th Army Group and German Army Group C	May – June 1944
Allied invasion of southern France (Operation Dragoon)	Allied and German	August 1944
Gothic Line	Allied Armies in Italy and German Army Group C	August 1944 – April 1945
Allied final offensive in Italy (Operation Grapeshot)	Allied 15th Army Group and German Army Group C	April – May 1945
Pacific Theater of Operations
Japanese invasion of French Indochina	Japanese and Vichy French forces	September 22–26, 1940
Battle of Malaya	Allied and Japanese	December 7, 1941 – February 14, 1942
Attack on Pearl Harbor	Japanese and US Navies	December 7, 1941
Malayan campaign	Japanese 25th Army	December 8, 1941 – January 31, 1942
Battle of Hong Kong	Japanese and British	December 8–25, 1941
Battle of the Coral Sea	Japanese and US Navies	May 1942
Battle of Midway	Japanese and US Navies	June 4–6, 1942
Battle of the Aleutian Islands	Imperial Japanese Navy Alaskan Strike Group	June 6, 1942 – August 15, 1943
Kokoda Track campaign	Australian and Japanese	July 21 – November 16, 1942
Battle of Savo Island	Allied and Japanese	August 8–9, 1942
Battle of the Eastern Solomons	Japanese and US	August 24–25, 1942
Guadalcanal campaign	Japanese and US land forces Japanese and US naval forces	August 1942 – February 1943
Battle of Milne Bay	Allied and Japanese	August 25 – September 7, 1942
Battle of Goodenough Island	Allied and Japanese	October 24–27, 1942
Battle of the Santa Cruz Islands	Japanese and US	October 25–27, 1942
Battle of Buna–Gona	Allied and Japanese	November 16, 1942 – January 22, 1943
Battle of the Bismarck Sea	Allied and Japanese	March 2–4, 1943
Battle of Tarawa	Japanese and US	November 20–23, 1943
Gilbert and Marshall Islands campaign	Allied and Japanese	November 1943 – February 1944
Battle of Arawe	Allied and Japanese	December 1943 – February 1944
Landing at Saidor	Allied and Japanese	January 2 – February 16, 1944
Admiralty Islands campaign	Allied and Japanese	February 29 – May 18, 1944
Battle of Saipan	Japanese and US	June 15 – July 9, 1944
Battle of the Philippine Sea	Japanese and US	June 19–20, 1944
Central Marianas campaign	US naval forces	June – November 1944
Second Battle of Guam	Japanese and US	July 21 – August 10, 1944
Battle of Tinian	Japanese and US	July 24 – August 1, 1944
Battle of Peleliu	Japanese and US	September 15 – November 27, 1944
Battle of Leyte	US naval invasion component	October 17, 1944
Battle of Leyte Gulf	Japanese and US	October 23–26, 1944
Battle of Central Burma	Japanese Burma Area Army and British Fourteenth Army	November 29, 1944 – March 28, 1945
Battle of Iwo Jima	Japanese and US	February 19 – March 26, 1945
Battle of Okinawa	Allied and Japanese naval forces Japanese and US ground forces	April 1 – June 22, 1945
Borneo campaign	Allied and Japanese	May 1 – August 15, 1945
Operation Downfall	Allied and Japanese	August 1945 (planned)
American Theater of Operations
Battle of the St. Lawrence	Canadian and German Navies	May 1942 – November 1944

National forces
Order of battle	Date
British Expeditionary Force	1940
British First Army	April 20, 1943
British First Army	May 4, 1943
British Long Range Penetration Groups (Chindits)	1943–1944
British Malaya Command	1942
British RAF Coastal Command	September 1939 – June 1944
German Air Force	April 9, 1940
German Ninth Army	October 1941
Italian Expeditionary Corps in Russia	August 1941 - July 1942
Italian Army in Russia	July 1942
Imperial Japanese Navy	December 1941
Japanese forces in the South Pacific	1944–1945
Japanese forces in Southeast Asia	1941–1945
Polish Army	1939
Polish cavalry brigades	1939
Polish Navy	1939
South African Army	September 1939 – July 1940
Soviet Air Force	May 1, 1945
Thai Phayap Army	May 1942 – August 1945
Turkish Army	June 1941

== Modern era ==
Battle or campaign	Order of battle	Date
First Indochina War
Battle of Dien Bien Phu	French Operational Group North-West and Viet Minh	March 13 – May 7, 1954
Korean War
Korean War	United Nations, North Korea, and People's Republic of China and People's Republic of China	June 1950
Korean War	U.S. Eighth Army, U.S. Seventh Fleet, and U.S. Air Force	June 1950
Korean War	Elements of the Australian army, navy, and air force	1950–1953
Battle of the Pusan Perimeter	UN and North Korean forces	August – September 1950
Battle of Chosin Reservoir	Chinese and United Nations forces	November – December 1950
Indonesia–Malaysia confrontation
Indonesia–Malaysia confrontation	Commonwealth forces	1963–1966
Vietnam War
Vietnam War	Elements of the Australian Army, Navy, and Air Force	1962–1972
Battle of Long Tan	Australian and Viet Cong forces	August 18, 1966
Algerian War
Algerian War	French Army	November 1, 1954 – March 19, 1962
Six-Day War
Six-Day War	Israeli and Arab Forces	June 5, 1967 – June 10, 1967
South African Border War
Operation Savannah	South African-allied and MPLA-allied forces	October 14, 1975 – January 1, 1976
Bangladesh Liberation War
Operation Searchlight	Pakistani Army	March 26 – May 25, 1971
Yom Kippur War
Operation Badr	Egyptian Army and Israel Defense Force	October 6–8, 1973
Iran–Iraq War
Iran–Iraq War	Iranian and Iraqi armies	1980
Falklands War
Military of the United Kingdom	British Land Forces Falkland Islands, Royal Air Force, and Royal Navy	April 2 – June 14, 1982
Military of Argentina	Argentine Army, Argentine Air Force, and Argentine Navy	April 2 – June 14, 1982
Somali Civil War
Present phase	Federal, Islamist, Somaliland and foreign forces	2009 onwards
Gulf War
Gulf War	Organization of United States Air Force Units in the Gulf War, Organization of United States Naval Aviation Units in the Gulf War, Naval organization of the U.S.-led coalition during the Gulf War	November 1990 – March 1991
Operation Granby	British forces	1990 – 1991
Liberation of Kuwait campaign	Coalition and Iraqi armies	February 24–28, 1991
Croatian War of Independence
Croatian War of Independence	Croatian Special Police	1991–95
Kargil War
Kargil War	Indian and Pakistani forces	1999
War on terrorism
Operation Enduring Freedom	US and coalition forces	October 7, 2001 onward
British operations in Afghanistan	British land and air forces	2002-2014
War in Afghanistan	NATO-led International Security Assistance Force	2001-2021
British operations in Iraq	British land, naval, and air forces	2003–2009
Invasion of Iraq	Coalition and Iraqi armies	March 19, 2003 – May 1, 2003
U.S. and Allies' operations in Iraq	Multi-National Force – Iraq and U.S. Central Command	May 2003 – December 2011
Battle of Mosul	Iraqi and Multi-National forces, ISIL	October 16, 2016 – July 20, 2017
Raqqa campaign (2016–17)	Syrian and Multi-National forces, ISIL	November 6, 2016 – October 20, 2017
2008 South Ossetia War
2008 South Ossetia War	Russian Army, Air Force, and Navy	August 7–16, 2008
Syrian Civil War
Operation Euphrates Shield	Turkish, Syrian Government, SDF-allied and ISIL forces	August 24, 2016 – March 29, 2017
Operation Olive Branch	Turkish-Syrian and Kurdish-Syrian forces	January 20, 2018 – August 9, 2019
2019 Turkish offensive into north-eastern Syria	Turkish-Syrian and SDF-allied forces	October 9 – November 25, 2019
Sino-Indian border dispute
Border skirmishes	Chinese and Indian forces	May 5, 2020 onward
Russo-Ukrainian War
Russian invasion of Ukraine	Russian and Ukrainian forces	February 24, 2022 onward
2023 Ukrainian counteroffensive	Russian and Ukrainian forces	June 4 – December, 2023
2024 northern Kharkiv offensive	Russian and Ukrainian forces	May 10, 2024 – June, 2024
Kharkiv Oblast campaign	Russian and Ukrainian forces	May 10, 2024 onward
Pokrovsk offensive	Russian and Ukrainian forces	July 18, 2024 onward
Kursk campaign	Russian and Ukrainian forces	August 6, 2024 – March, 2025
Gaza war
Gaza war	Hamas and allied forces and Israeli Defence Forces	October 7, 2023 onward

== Others ==
Orders of battle for nations	Date
Argentine Army regiments	Current structure
Australian Army	Current structure
Royal Australian Air Force	Current structure
British 6th Airborne Division	1943–1948
British Army Structure	1989
Royal Air Force Structure	1989
British Army	Current structure
Canadian Army	Current structure
Chilean Army	Current structure
Chinese Navy	Current structure
Egyptian Expeditionary Force	March 1916 – September 1918
French Army	Current structure
French Army	1989
German Air Force	1933–1945
Tank battalions of the German Army	1956–2008
Greek Air Force	Current structure
Greek Army	Current structure
Indonesian National Armed Forces	1946
Iranian Army	Current structure
Italian Army	Current structure
Italian Army	1984
NATO, Allied Forces Baltic Approache	1989
NATO Central Army Group	1989
NATO Northern Army Group	1989
New Zealand Army	Current structure
Royal New Zealand Air Force	Current structure
Norwegian Army	Current structure
Pakistani Army	Current structure
Pakistani forces in Tribal Areas	Current structure
Riverine Flotilla of the Polish Navy	Inter-War period
Polish Army	1980s
Russian Air Force	2008
Soviet Army divisions	1917–1945
Soviet Army divisions	1989–1991
Swiss Armed Forces	Current structure
Turkish Army	2008
United States Army Pacific	1989
United States Navy	1989
United States Armed Forces	Current structure
United States Army	Current structure
United States Marine Corps	Current structure
United States Navy	Current structure
United States Coast Guard	Current structure
United States Department of Defense	Current structure

== See also ==
- Lists of wars in World (by date, region, type of conflict, death toll)
  - Lists of wars and conflict by region
    - Lists of battles (Orders)
  - List of terrorist incidents
    - List of active rebel groups
    - List of rebel groups that control territory
    - List of designated terrorist organisations
  - List of number of conflicts per year
    - List of most lethal battles in world history
  - List of wars by death toll
- Africa :
  - List of conflicts in Africa (Military history of Africa)
    - List of modern conflicts in North Africa (Maghreb)
    - Conflicts in the Horn of Africa (East region)
- Americas :
  - List of conflicts in North America
    - List of wars involving the United States
  - List of conflicts in Central America
  - List of conflicts in South America
- Asia :
  - List of conflicts in Asia
  - List of conflicts in the Near East
  - List of conflicts in the Middle East
    - List of modern conflicts in the Middle East
- Europe :
  - List of conflicts in Europe
    - Post-Cold War European conflicts
- Others :
  - List of wars extended by diplomatic irregularity
  - Uppsala Conflict Data Program
  - Failed State
- Ongoing conflicts in World (Commons Maps) :
  - List of ongoing armed conflicts
  - List of wars 2011–present
    - Ongoing military conflicts
    - Maps of ongoing conflicts
