= Finnish Civil War order of battle =

This is the order of battle of the Finnish Civil War.

== Finnish reds and allies ==
- Finnish Reds
  - Red Guards
    - Helsinki Red Guard
    - Jyry's Company
    - Lahti Regiment
    - Sahalahti Red Guard
    - Finnish Civil War Women's Guards
      - Tampere Women's Guard
      - Valkeakoski Women's Guard
    - Vyborg Red Guard
      - Vyborg Signaling Company

== Finnish whites and allies ==
- Finnish Whites
  - Civil Guard
    - Eastern Army
      - 1st Jaeger Brigade
        - 1st Jaeger Regiment
          - 1st Jaeger Battalion
          - 2nd Jaeger Battalion
          - 3rd Jaeger Battalion
        - 2nd Jaeger Regiment
          - 4th Jaeger Battalion
          - 6th Jaeger Battalion
          - 12th Jaeger Battalion
      - 2nd Jaeger Brigade
        - 3rd Jaeger Regiment
          - 5th Jaeger Battalion
          - 7th Jaeger Battalion
          - 10th Jaeger Battalion
        - 4th Jaeger Regiment
          - 8th Jaeger Battalion
          - 9th Jaeger Battalion
          - 11th Jaeger Battalion
      - 3rd Jaeger Brigade
        - 5th Jaeger Regiment
          - 13th Jaeger Battalion
          - 14th Jaeger Battalion
          - 15th Jaeger Battalion
        - 6th Jaeger Regiment
          - 16th Jaeger Battalion
          - 17th Jaeger Battalion
          - 18th Jaeger Battalion
      - Jaeger Artillery Brigade
        - 1st Jaeger Battery
        - 2nd Jaeger Battery
        - 3rd Jaeger Battery
      - Karelian Army Corps
        - 1st Karelian Regiment
          - 1st Battalion
          - 2nd Battalion
          - 3rd Battalion
        - 2nd Karelian Regiment
          - 4th Battalion
          - 5th Battalion
          - 6th Battalion
          - 10th Battalion
          - 11th Battalion
          - 1st Machine Gun Division
          - 2nd Machine Gun Division
        - 3rd Karelian Regiment
          - 7th Battalion
          - 8th Battalion
          - 9th Battalion
      - Pohjois Häme Regiment
        - 1st Battalion
        - 2nd Battalion
        - 3rd Battalion
      - Vaasa Regiment
        - 1st Battalion
        - 2nd Battalion
        - 3rd Battalion
      - Pohjois Savo Regiment
        - 1st Battalion
        - 2nd Battalion
        - 3rd Battalion
      - Karelian Cavalry Jaeger Regiment
    - Western Army
      - Linder's group
        - 8th Pori Regiment
        - 4th North Ostrobothnia Regiment
          - 1st Battalion
          - 2nd Battalion
          - 3rd Battalion
      - Varsinais-Suomen Regiment
        - 1st Battalion
        - 2nd Battalion
        - Salo Region Free Corps
      - Hjalmarson's group
        - 1st Grenadier Regiment
          - Grenadier Battalion of Vaasa
          - Kristiina Grenadier Battalion
          - Oulu Grenadier Battalion
        - 2nd Grenadier Regiment
          - Jyväskylä Battalion
          - Savo's Battalion
          - Seinäjoki Battalion
        - Tarragon Regiment of Uusimaa
      - Bergström's group
        - 5. Southern Ostrobothnia Regiment
          - 1st South Ostrobothnia Reserve Battalion
          - 2nd South Ostrobothnia Reserve Battalion
          - 3rd South Ostrobothnia Reserve Battalion
        - 1st Battalion of the North Häme Regiment
      - Western Army Reserve
      - Häme stage battalion
      - Reinforcement Battalion of the North Savo Regiment
      - Reinforcement Battalion of the Etelä Savo Regiment
      - Savo Stage Battalion
    - Helsinki White Guard
    - Uudenmaa Dragoon Regiment
      - Uudenmaa Dragoon Squadron
      - Uudenmaa Machinegun Squadron
    - West Uusimaa Battalion
  - Swedish Brigade
  - Archipelago Free Corps
  - Salla's regiment
  - Estonian volunteers
  - Polish Legion
- German Empire
  - Imperial German Army
    - Jäger Movement
      - 27th Jäger Battalion
    - Detachment Brandenstein
  - Imperial German Navy
    - Baltic Sea Division
      - 95. Reserve Infantry Brigade
      - 2. Guards Cavalry Brigade

== See also ==
- List of orders of battle
