= Battle of Uclés (1809) order of battle =

The Battle of Uclés (1809) order of battle is shown below. The action was fought on 13 January 1809 during the Peninsular War. An Imperial French corps led by Marshal Claude Perrin Victor severely mauled a Spanish army commanded by Francisco Javier Venegas.

== Abbreviations ==
- General of Division = GD
- General of Brigade = GB

== Orders of battle ==
=== Spanish order of battle ===
- General Francisco Venegas

- Charles Oman: 9,203 infantry, 1,814 cavalry, 383 sappers, 100 artillery (Note: The Military Orders, Irlanda, and Cadiz Tiradores Regiments had several companies detached and hence were not at the full stated strength.)
- David Gates: 9,500 infantry, 2,000 cavalry, 480 artillery, 4 guns
- Digby Smith: 9,771 infantry, 1,814 cavalry, 769 artillery and sappers, 5 guns

Spanish Force of General Venegas - Battle of Uclés
Detached from	Strength	Unit	Strength
Vanguard	2,848	Murcia Infantry Regiment	652
Vanguard	2,848	Cantabria Infantry Regiment, 1st Battalion	315
Vanguard	2,848	Jaen Provincial Militia Regiment	342
Vanguard	2,848	Chinchilla Provincial Militia Regiment	354
Vanguard	2,848	Catalan Volunteers Regiment	499
Vanguard	2,848	Barbastro Cazadores Regiment	221
Vanguard	2,848	Campo Mayor Infantry Regiment	465
1st Division	2,804	Africa Infantry Regiment, 1st and 3rd Battalions	771
1st Division	2,804	Burgos Infantry Regiment, 1st and 3rd Battalions	519
1st Division	2,804	3rd Seville Volunteers Regiment	106
1st Division	2,804	Cuenca Provincial Militia Regiment	626
1st Division	2,804	Navas de Tolosa Cazadores Regiment	542
1st Division	2,804	Cadiz Tiradores Regiment	818
2nd Division	1,917	Military Orders Infantry Regiment, 1st, 2nd, and 3rd Battalions	848
2nd Division	1,917	4th Seville Volunteers Regiment	224
2nd Division	1,917	Toro Provincial Militia Regiment	265
2nd Division	1,917	Bailén Cazadores Regiment	472
2nd Division	1,917	Carmona Volunteers Regiment	456
Reserve	1,634	Walloon Guard Infantry Regiment, 1st Battalion	425
Reserve	1,634	Irlanda Infantry Regiment, 1st Battalion	377
Reserve	1,634	Andalucia Provincial Grenadier Regiment	522
Cavalry	1,814	Castilla Dragoon Regiment	125
Cavalry	1,814	Borbon Dragoon Regiment	119
Cavalry	1,814	España Dragoon Regiment	342
Cavalry	1,814	Lusitania Dragoon Regiment	158
Cavalry	1,814	Pavia Dragoon Regiment	428
Cavalry	1,814	Principe Cavalry Regiment	141
Cavalry	1,814	Reyna Cavalry Regiment	276
Cavalry	1,814	Santiago Cavalry Regiment	74
Cavalry	1,814	Tercio de Tejas Cavalry Regiment	131
Artillery and Sappers	483	Artillerymen (4 guns) (Note: Venegas had 5 guns, but 1 was broken down and not usable. (Oman, p. 10))	100
Artillery and Sappers	483	Sappers	383

=== French order of battle ===
- Marshal Claude Perrin Victor

- Charles Oman: 12,000 infantry, 3,500 cavalry
- David Gates: 12,000 infantry, 3,800 cavalry, 500 artillery, 32 guns
- Digby Smith: 12,000 infantry, 3,500 cavalry, 48 guns

I Corps of Claude Victor on 1 February 1809
Division	Strength	Unit
1st Division; GD François Amable Ruffin	5,429	9th Light Infantry Regiment (3 battalions)
1st Division; GD François Amable Ruffin	5,429	24th Line Infantry Regiment (3 battalions)
1st Division; GD François Amable Ruffin	5,429	96th Line Infantry Regiment (3 battalions)
2nd Division; GD Pierre Belon Lapisse	(7,692)	Detached
3rd Division; GD Eugène-Casimir Villatte	6,376	27th Light Infantry Regiment (3 battalions)
3rd Division; GD Eugène-Casimir Villatte	6,376	63rd Line Infantry Regiment (3 battalions)
3rd Division; GD Eugène-Casimir Villatte	6,376	94th Line Infantry Regiment (3 battalions)
3rd Division; GD Eugène-Casimir Villatte	6,376	95th Line Infantry Regiment (3 battalions)
Corps Cavalry; GB Louis-Chrétien Carrière, Baron de Beaumont	1,386	2nd Hussar Regiment
Corps Cavalry; GB Louis-Chrétien Carrière, Baron de Beaumont	1,386	5th Horse Chasseur Regiment
Corps Cavalry; GB Louis-Chrétien Carrière, Baron de Beaumont	(487)	Westphalian Chevau-Léger Regiment (Note: Gates stated that only 2 French light cavalry units were at Uclés. This suggests that the Westphalian unit served elsewhere. (Gates, p. 117))
1st Dragoon Division (Note: The three dragoon brigades were commanded by GBs André Thomas Perreimond, Ignace Laurent d'Oullenbourg, and Alexandre, vicomte Digeon. It is not known which regiments belonged to each brigade.); GD Victor de Fay de La Tour-Maubourg	2,527	1st Dragoon Regiment
1st Dragoon Division; GD Victor de Fay de La Tour-Maubourg	2,527	2nd Dragoon Regiment
1st Dragoon Division; GD Victor de Fay de La Tour-Maubourg	2,527	4th Dragoon Regiment
1st Dragoon Division; GD Victor de Fay de La Tour-Maubourg	2,527	9th Dragoon Regiment (Note: Smith stated that the 20th Dragoon Regiment rather than the 9th was part of this division. (Smith, p. 278) According to Oman, the 20th was transferred to the 2nd Dragoon Division and replaced by the 9th. (Oman, p. 627))
1st Dragoon Division; GD Victor de Fay de La Tour-Maubourg	2,527	14th Dragoon Regiment
1st Dragoon Division; GD Victor de Fay de La Tour-Maubourg	2,527	26th Dragoon Regiment
Artillery	32 guns (Note: The I Corps artillery had 48 guns manned by 1,523 gunners. (Oman, p. 624) Smith stated that each of the two infantry divisions at Uclés had two foot batteries and the cavalry had two horse batteries. (Smith, p. 277) Assuming Gates was correct that there were 32 French guns at Uclés, then the other 16 guns belonging to the corps were probably with Lapisse. This is only speculative.)	Four Foot artillery batteries
Artillery	32 guns	Two Horse artillery batteries

== Notes ==
Footnotes

Citations

== See also ==
- List of orders of battle
