= Battle of Glorieta Pass order of battle =

The following Union Army and Confederate States Army units and commanders fought in the Battle of Glorieta Pass of the American Civil War.

== Abbreviations used ==
=== Military rank ===
- Col = Colonel
- Ltc = Lieutenant Colonel
- Maj = Major
- Cpt = Captain
- Lt = 1st Lieutenant
- 2Lt = 2nd Lieutenant

== Union army ==
Col John P. Slough

Flanking Column
Maj John M. Chivington

First Battalion (provisional)
Cpt William H. Lewis

5th U.S. Infantry, Company A: Lt Samuel Barr
5th U.S. Infantry, Company G: Lt Stephen Norvell
1st Colorado Infantry, Company B: Cpt Samuel M. Logan
Independent Company of Colorado Volunteers: Cpt James Hobart Ford
New Mexico Volunteers (detachment): Ltc Manuel Antonio Chaves

Organization of both Union and Confederate forces during the Battle of Glorieta Pass in March 1862

Second Battalion (provisional)
Cpt Edward W. Wynkoop

1st Colorado Infantry, Company A: 1st Lt. James R. Shaffer
1st Colorado Infantry, Company E: Cpt Scott J. Anthony
1st Colorado Infantry, Company H: Cpt George L. Sanborn

Main Column
Col John P. Slough

Field Battalion (provisional)
Ltc Samuel F. Tappan

1st Colorado Infantry, Company C: Cpt Richard Sopris
1st Colorado Infantry, Company D: Cpt Jacob Downing
1st Colorado Infantry, Company G: Cpt William F. Wilder
1st Colorado Infantry, Company I: Lt Charles Kerber
1st Colorado Infantry, Company K: Cpt Samuel H. Robbins
Heavy Battery: Cpt John F. Ritter
Light Battery: Lt Ira W. Claflin

Cavalry Reserve
Col John P. Slough

3rd U.S. Cavalry, Company C: Cpt George W. Howland
3rd U.S. Cavalry, Company E: Cpt Charles J. Walker
1st Colorado, Company F: Cpt Samuel H. Cook

== Confederate Army ==
Ltc William Read Scurry

2nd Texas Mounted Rifles: Maj Charles L. Pyron
4th Texas Mounted Volunteers: Maj Henry W. Raguet
5th Texas Mounted Volunteers: Maj John S. Shropshire
7th Texas Mounted Volunteers: Maj Powhatan Jordan

Independent Attached Units

Arizona Rangers: 2Lt William Simmons
Brigands (Santa Fe Gamblers): Cpt John G. Phillips
San Elizario Spy Company: Lt J. R. Parsons

Artillery Battery: 2Lt James Bradford
