= Battle of Guaqui order of battle =

This is the order of battle for the Battle of Guaqui (Huaqui) in the Argentine War of Independence during the Spanish American wars of independence.

== See also ==
- List of orders of battle
