= Operation Perch order of battle =

This is the order of battle for the Operation Perch, a World War II operation between British and German forces in Normandy, France between June 6 and June 19, 1944.

== British Order of Battle ==
=== 21st Army Group ===
General Officer Commanding-in-Chief: General Sir Bernard Montgomery
Chief of the General Staff: Freddie de Guingand

=== Second Army ===
General Officer Commanding-in-Chief: Lieutenant-General Miles Dempsey

=== I Corps ===
Lieutenant-General John Crocker

- 51st (Highland) Infantry Division - Major-General Bullen-Smith
- 4th Armoured Brigade

=== XXX Corps ===
Lieutenant-General Gerard Bucknall

- 7th Armoured Division - Major-General George Erskine
- 49th (West Riding) Infantry Division - Major-General Evelyn Barker
- 50th (Northumbrian) Infantry Division - Major-General Douglas Graham
- 8th Armoured Brigade

== German order of battle ==
=== I SS Panzer Corps ===
SS-Obergruppenführer Sepp Dietrich

- Panzer-Lehr-Division
- 12th SS Panzer Division Hitlerjugend
- 21st Panzer Division
- Heavy SS Panzer Battalion 101

=== XLVII Panzer Corps ===
- 2nd Panzer Division

=== LXXXIV Korps ===
- 352nd Infantry Division
- 716th Static Infantry Division

== See also ==
- List of orders of battle

== Notes ==
Footnotes

Citations
