= Battle of Pichincha order of battle =

This is the order of battle for the Battle of Pichincha in the Ecuadorian War of Independence and Campaigns of the South during the Spanish American wars of independence.

== See also ==
- List of orders of battle
