= Battle of Cancha Rayada (1818) order of battle =

This is the order of battle for the Battle of Cancha Rayada (1818) in the Chilean War of Independence and Argentine War of Independence during the Spanish American wars of independence.

== See also ==
- List of orders of battle
