= Russo-Georgian War order of battle: Russia =

The following units of the Russian army, air force, and Russian navy participated in the Russo-Georgian War in 2008.

== Order of battle ==
=== 58th Army ===
- 19th Motorized Rifle Division
  - 249th Motorized Rifle Regiment
  - 503rd Motorized Rifle Regiment
  - 693rd Motorized Rifle Regiment
  - 292nd Self-propelled Artillery Regiment
  - 481st Air defense missile Regiment
  - 141st Armor Battalion
  - Armored engineer Battalion
  - Military intelligence battalion
  - Signal battalion
  - Chemical battalion
  - Supply battalion
  - Mechanical battalion
  - Medical battalion
- 136th Guards Motorized Infantry Brigade
- 205th Motorized Infantry Brigade

Supporting units

- 135th Motorized Infantry Regiment
- 291st Self-propelled Artillery Regiment
- 67th Air Defense Regiment
- 1,128th Antitank Regiment
- 943rd Rocket Launcher Regiment
- 487th Helicopter Regiment
- 11th Engineer Regiment
- 234th Signal Regiment
- 22nd Electronic Warfare Regiment
- Elements of 76th and 98th Guards Airborne Divisions
- two companies from 42nd Motorized Rifle Division

Operations in Abkhazia

- 131st Moor Rifle Brigade
- Elements of 76th and 98th Guards Airborne Divisions

=== 4th Air Army ===
1st Composite Air Division

- 368th Assault Aviation Regiment
- 461st Assault Aviation Regiment
- 960th Assault Air Regiment
- 5559th Bomber Aviation Regiment
- 959th Bomber Aviation Regiment

51st Air Defense Corps

- 3rd Fighter Aviation Regiment
- 19th Fighter Aviation Regiment
- 31st Fighter Aviation Regiment
- Two SAM regiments Unattached units
- 11th Reconnaissance Air Regiment
- 535th Composite Air Regiment
- 55th Helicopter Regiment
- 487th Helicopter Regiment
- 325th Transport Helicopter Regiment

=== Naval forces ===
- Slava-class cruiser
- Kashin-class destroyer
- Alligator-class and Ropucha-class landing ships
- smaller craft

== Sources ==
- Costello, Bruce "The Russo-Georgian War of 2008." in Strategy & Tactics, No. 264 (September/October 2010).
