= Battle of Rocroi order of battle =

The following units and commanders of the French and Spanish armies fought in the Battle of Rocroi on May 19, 1643.

== French forces ==
Army of Picardie
Louis II of Bourbon, Duc d'Enghien

Artillery
Henri de Chivre, Marquis de la Barre

- 12 sub-par guns in two batteries

Division	Brigade	Regiments and Others
Left Wing; Henri de Saint-Nectaire, Marquis de la Ferte	Henri de Saint-Nectaire, Marquis de la Ferte	Régiment des Fusiliers à Cheval du Roi; Régiment de Guiche; Régiment de la Ferte; Régiment de Beauveau; Régiment de la Clauiere
Left Wing; Henri de Saint-Nectaire, Marquis de la Ferte	François de l'Hospital	Régiment d'Arcourt; Régiment de Hendicourt; Régiment de Marolle; Régiment de Notaf
Center (Army of Champagne); Joigny, Marquis d'Espenan	Marquis d'Espenan	Régiment de Piémont; Régiment de Rambure; Régiment de Bourdonne et Biscaras; Régiment de Molandin (Swiss); Régiment de Persan; Régiment de la Marine; Régiment de Picardie
Center (Army of Champagne); Joigny, Marquis d'Espenan	General la Valiere	Régiment de Bussy et Guiche; Régiment de Lantern et Breze; Régiment de von Roll (Swiss); Régiment Ecossais (Scotland); Régiment de Watteville (Swiss); Régiment de Vidame; Régiment de Veruins et la Pree
Right Wing; Jean, Comte de Gassion	Jean, Comte de Gassion	Régiment de Suilly; Régiment de Coeslin; Régiment de Lenoncourt; Régiment du Maitre de Camp; Régiment Royal; Régiment de Gardes; Raab Squadron (Croatia); Chack Squadron (Hungary)
Right Wing; Jean, Comte de Gassion	Duc d'Enghien	Leschelle Squadron; Sillart Squadron; Menneville Squadron; Roclore Squadron; Vamberg Squadron
	Reserve Claude de Lotouf, Baron de Sirot	Régiment Charost; Régiment de Miliciens Royaux; Régiment de Gendarmes; Régiment de Watteville (Swiss); Régiment de Gendarmes; Régiment d'Infanterie; Régiment de Sirot

== Spanish forces ==
Army of Flanders
Captain General Don Francisco de Melo

Artillery
Alvaro de Melo

- 18 guns in nine batteries

Division	Brigade	Regiments and Others
Left Wing; Francisco de la Cueva, Duque de Albuquerque: All units from Flanders	Juan Perez de Vivero	Section de Baron de Andre; Section de Vigilio Orsini; Section de Cesare Toralto; Section de Antonio de Ulloa; Section de Antonio de Butron; Section de Juan de Borga; Section de Gaspar de Bonifacio
Left Wing; Francisco de la Cueva, Duque de Albuquerque: All units from Flanders	Pedro de Villamor	Section de Baron de Bramont; Section de Juan Mascarenns; Section de Ermes Bentivoglio; Section de Antonio de Rojas; Section de Antonio Barraquin; Section de Francisco Moron
Center; Paul Bernard, Conde de Fontaine (k)	Paul Bernard Conde de Fontaine	Musketeer Detachment; Tercio de Conde de Saint-Amour (Burgundy); Tercio de Antonio de Velandia-Guzman (Spain); Tercio de Bernardino de Ayala, Conde de Villalba (Spain); Tercio de Duque de Albuquerque (Spain); Tercio de Fernando de Quesada, I Conde de Garciez (Spain); Tercio de Jorge de Castellvi (Spain); Tercio de Alonso de Strozzi (Italy); Tercio de Luis de Vixconti (Italy); Tercio de Giovanni de Liponti (Italy)
Center; Paul Bernard, Conde de Fontaine (k)	Antonio de Quevado	Tercio de Ligne (Walloon); Tercio de Ribeaucourt (Walloon); Tercio de Meghen (Walloon); Tercio de Bassigny (Walloon); Tercio de Granges (Walloon); Tercio de Giulio Frangipani (Germany); Tercio de Ottavio Guasco (Germany); Tercio de Ambisi (Germany); Tercio de Rittberg (Germany)
Right Wing; Ernst, Graf von Isenburg: Unless otherwise noted, all units are from Alsace	Conde de Bucquoy	Regimiento Jakob de Broncq; Regimiento de Donckel; Regimiento de Bucquoy
Right Wing; Ernst, Graf von Isenburg: Unless otherwise noted, all units are from Alsace	Jacinto de Vera	Regimento de Neygb Ystuan (Croatia/Eastern Europe); Regimiento de Vichet; Regimiento de Sanary; Regimiento de Vera
	Reserve Baron de Andre	Compania de Antonia Vicentino (Flanders); Compania de Carlo de Colombo (Flanders); Compania de Conde de Umego (Flanders); Compania de "Andre's Own" (Flanders)

== Sources ==
- Higgins, David. "Battle File: Rocroi, 19 May 1643." Strategy & Tactics, Number 244 (July 2007).
