= Beiping–Suiyuan Railway Operation order of battle =

Order of battle Beiping–Suiyuan Railway Operation refers to the troops involved in the 1937 Beiping–Suiyuan Railway Operation.

== Order ==
China

Taiyuan Pacification Headquarters – Yan Xishan,

- 1st Cavalry Army (temporarily attached) – Chao Cheng-shou
  - 1st Cavalry Division – Pen Yu-pin
  - 2nd Cavalry Division – Sun Chang-sheng
  - New 2nd Cavalry Brigade – Shih Yu-shan
  - 218th Inf. Bde – Tung Chi-wu
  - New 3rd Inf. Bde – Ching The-chuan
  - New 5th Inf. Bde – An Yung-chang
  - New 6th Inf. Bde – Wang Tse-hsiu
  - 6th Cavalry Division – Liu Tan-fu
  - 7th Cavalry Division – Men Bingyue
- 7th Group Army – Fu Zuoyi
  - 7th Group Army Temporary Group – Fu Zuoyi (concurrent)
    - 72nd Division – Chen Chang-chieh (陈长捷)
    - 7th Separate Brigade - Ma Yen-shou
    - 200th Brigade - Liu Tan-fu
    - 211th Brigade - Sun Lan-feng
  - 7th Army Group Detachment - Liu Ruming (7th Army Deputy)
    - 143rd Division - Liu Ruming (concurrent)
    - 27th Separate Brigade - Liu Ju-chen (withdrawn from Beiping)
    - Chahar Peace Preservation Brigade
    - Chahar Peace Preservation Brigade
- Frontline Group – Tang Enbo
  - 13th Army – Tang Enbo (concurrent)
    - 4th Division – Wan Wang–ling (王万龄)
    - 89th Division – Wang Chung-lien (王仲廉)
  - 17th Army – Kao Kuei-tse
    - 21st Division – Li Hsien-chou (李仙洲)
    - 84th Division – Kao Kuei–tse (concurrent) (高桂滋)

1st Army Region – Chiang Kai-shek

- 14th Group Army - Wei Li-huang
  - 85th Division – Chen Tieh (陈铁)
  - 14th Army – Li Mo-yen
    - 10th Division – Li Mo-yen (concurrent) (李黙庵)
    - 83rd Division – Liu Kan (刘戡)

Notes

- + Reorganized Divisions without German training.

== See also ==
- Operation Chahar
