= Operation Chahar order of battle =

The order of battle for Operation Chahar, in the history of the Second Sino-Japanese War (1937–1945), was:

== Orbat for Operation Chahar ==
Japan

Peiping Railway Garrison Force, Nan-kou Front - Gen. Kiyoshi Katsuki [1] [4]

- 5th Division – Gen. Seishiro Itagaki[4]
  - 9th Infantry Brigade
    - 11th Infantry Regiment
    - 41st Infantry Regiment
  - 21st Infantry Brigade
    - 21st Infantry Regiment
    - 42nd Infantry Regiment
  - 5th Mountain Artillery Regiment
  - 5th Cavalry Regiment
  - 5th Engineer Regiment
  - 5th Transport Regiment
  - 4th Tank Battalion from Sakai Brigade -
- 11th Independent Mixed Brigade- Gen. Shigeyasu Suzuki
  - 11th Independent Infantry Regiment
  - 12th Independent Infantry Regiment
  - 11th Independent Cavalry Company
  - 11th Independent Field Artillery Regiment
  - 12th Independent Mountain Gun Regiment
  - 11th Independent Engineer Company
  - 11th Independent Transport Company
  - Tank Unit – from China Stationed Tank Unit

Kwantung Army [1] [4]

- Manchukuo 5th District Army - General Shigero Fujii [7]
  - Jehol Detachment
- Chahar Expeditionary Force - Lt. General Hideki Tojo[5], Kalgan Front
  - 1st Independent Mixed Brigade (Sakai Brigade)- Lt. Gen Sakai Koji
    - 4th Tank Battalion - ? [6]
      - 12 x Type 89 Medium Tanks
      - 13 x Type 95 Light Tanks
      - 12 x Type 94 Tankettes
      - 4 x Armored Engineer Vehicles
    - 1st Independent Infantry Regiment
    - 1st Independent Artillery Battalion
    - 1st Independent Engineer Company
  - 2nd Mixed Brigade - Major Gen Masaki Honda [5](from 1st Division) Kwantung Army)
    - 1st Infantry Regiment - Col Sogawa[5]
    - 3rd Infantry Regiment - Col Yuasa[5]
  - 3rd Battalion/57th Infantry Regiment
  - 2nd Co./1st Cavalry Regiment
  - 4th Battalion/1st Field Artillery Regiment
  - 1st Co./1st Engineer Regiment
  - Ohizumi Detachment (大泉支隊) - ? [7]
    - one battalion / 4th Infantry Regiment / 2nd Division
  - 15th Mixed Brigade – Major Gen. Seiichiro Shinohara (from 2nd Division, Kwantung Army)
    - 16th Infantry Regiment - Col Goto [5]
    - 30th Infantry Regiment - Col Ikagura [5]
  - 2nd Cavalry Regiment - Lt Col Honda[5]
  - 2nd Field Artillery Regiment - Col Takahashi[5]
  - 2nd Engineer Regiment - Col Ito[5]
  - 2nd Transport Regiment
  - Mongolian Army – Prince Teh Wang, Pao Yueh-ching [2]
    - 1st Cavalry Division
    - 2nd Cavalry Division
    - 3rd Cavalry Division
    - 4th Cavalry Division
    - 5th Cavalry Division
    - 6th Cavalry Division
    - 7th Cavalry Division
    - 8th Cavalry Division
- 2nd Air Group Operation Quhar - ? [3]
  - 12th Air Regiment 2 bomber squadrons Ki-2
  - 15th Air Regiment 4 scout plane squadrons Ki-4's and Ki.15's
  - 2nd Battalion / 16th Air Regiment Ki-10

2 fighter squadrons, 4 scout plane squadrons, 2 bomber squadrons,

Airforce:

- Rinji Hikodan[3]
  - 1st Hiko Daitai/16th Hiko Rentai [Kawasaki Ki-10]
    - 1st Chutai
    - 2nd Chutai
  - Light bomber daitai/16th Hiko Rentai [Type 88 reconnaissance aircraft]
  - 2nd Hiko Daitai [Kawasaki Ki-10]
    - 1st Chutai
    - 2nd Chutai
  - 8th Hiko Daitai[Kawasaki Ki-10]
    - 1st Chutai
    - 2nd Chutai
  - 12th Hiko Rentai [Mitsubishi Ki-2 Type 94 observation aircraft]
  - Dokuritsu Hiko Dai 3 Chutai (Independent Company). Army Tipe 93 Heavy Bomber Mitsubishi Ki-1. 9 Aircraft
  - Independent 4th Dokuritsu Hiko Chutai [Reconnaissance squadron ]
  - Independent 6th Dokuritsu Hiko Chutai [Reconnaissance squadron ]
  - Independent 9th Dokuritsu Hiko Chutai [Kawasaki Ki-10]

Notes:

1. Kwantung Army and Chahar Expeditionary Force were under the command of Central Supreme Command but were not under unified command on the battlefield in this campaign.
2. 11th Independent Mixed Brigade was subordinated to Kwantung Army, At the end of July it was attached to Peiping Railway Garrison Force. In early September, it reverted to the Chahar Expeditionary Force.
3. 2nd and 15th Mixed Brigades were detachments from Divisions of the Kwantung Army.

== Sources ==
1. Jowett, Phillip S., Rays of The Rising Sun, Armed Forces of Japan's Asian Allies 1931-45, Volume I: China & Manchuria, 2004. Helion & Co. Ltd., 26 Willow Rd., Solihull, West Midlands, England.
2. Japanese Square Divisions from Madej's reprint of wartime US intelligence manual.
3. Madej, W. Victor. Japanese Armed Forces Order of Battle, 1937-1945 [2 vols]. Allentown, PA: 1981
4. Operation Quhar, https://takihomepage.web.fc2.com/history.htm
