= Battle of Curupayty order of battle =

The following units and commanders of the Paraguayan army and the army of the Triple Alliance took part in the Battle of Curupayty on September 22, 1866.

== Paraguayan Army ==
General José E. Díaz

Brigade	Regiments and Others
Infantry Lieutenant Colonel Luis Gonzales	4th Infantry Battalion; 7th Infantry Battalion; 9th Infantry Battalion; 27th Infantry Battalion; 36th Infantry Battalion; 38th Infantry Battalion; 40th "Asuncion" Battalion
Cavalry reserve Captain Bernardino Caballero	6th Cavalry Regiment; 8th Cavalry Regiment; 9th Cavalry Regiment; 36th Cavalry Regiment
Artillery	50 gun of assorted caliber

== Triple Alliance Army ==
Commander-in-chief Bartolomé Mitre

=== Brazilian II Corps ===
General Antonio Paranhos, Viscount of Porto Alegre

Division	Brigade	Regiments and Others
Caldas Division	2nd Infantry Brigade	5th Volunteer Battalion; 8th Volunteer Battalion; 12th Volunteer Battalion; 11th Line Battalion
Caldas Division	3rd Infantry Brigade	18th Volunteer Battalion; 32nd Volunteer Battalion; 36th Volunteer Battalion
Caldas Division	7th Cavalry Brigade	7th National Guard Provisional Corps; 8th National Guard Provisional Corps; 9th National Guard Provisional Corps
Albino de Carvalho Division	Auxiliary Brigade	6th Battalion; 10th Volunteer Battalion; 11th Volunteer Battalion; 20th Volunteer Battalion; 46th Volunteer Battalion
Albino de Carvalho Division	1st Infantry Brigade	29th Volunteer Battalion; 34th Volunteer Battalion; 47th Volunteer Battalion
Albino de Carvalho Division	4th Cavalry Brigade	1st Chaussers Battalion; 2nd Chaussers Battalion; 5th Chaussers Battalion
De Lima Division (reserve)	6th Brigade	4th Cavalry Provisional Corps of the National Guard; 5th Cavalry Provisional Corps of the National Guard; 10th Cavalry Provisional Corps of the National Guard
De Lima Division (reserve)	8th Brigade	11th Cavalry Provisional Corps of the National Guard; 12th Cavalry Provisional Corps of the National Guard
De Lima Division (reserve)	Light Brigade	13th Cavalry Provisional Corps of the National Guard; 14th Cavalry Provisional Corps of the National Guard; 15th Cavalry Provisional Corps of the National Guard

=== Argentine I Corps ===
General Wenceslao Paunero

Division	Brigade	Regiments and Others
1st Infantry Division	1st Infantry Brigade	two infantry battalions
1st Infantry Division	2nd Infantry Brigade	one infantry battalion; the Military Legion
2nd Infantry Division	3rd Infantry Brigade	two infantry battalions
2nd Infantry Division	4th Infantry Brigade	one infantry battalion; 1st Volunteer Legion
3rd Infantry Division	5th Infantry Brigade	two infantry battalions
3rd Infantry Division	6th Infantry Brigade	two infantry battalions
4th Infantry Division	7th Infantry Brigade	two Infantry battalions
4th Infantry Division	8th Infantry Brigade	one infantry battalion; 2nd Volunteer Legion

=== Argentine II Corps ===
General Emilio Mitre

Division	Brigade	Regiments and Others
1st Infantry Division	1st Infantry Brigade	two infantry battalions
1st Infantry Division	2nd Infantry Brigade	two infantry battalions
2nd Infantry Division	3rd Infantry Brigade	two infantry battalions
2nd Infantry Division	4th Infantry Brigade	two infantry battalions
3rd Infantry Division	5th Infantry Brigade	Battalion Cordoba; Battalion San Juan
3rd Infantry Division	6th Infantry Brigade	Battalion Mendoza; 2nd Entrerríos
4th Infantry Division; Colonel Mateo Martinez	7th Infantry Brigade	9th Line Battalion; 12th Line Battalion; 3rd Entre Rios Battalion
4th Infantry Division; Colonel Mateo Martinez	8th Infantry Brigade	1st Line Battalion; 2nd Line Battalion; 3rd National Guard Battalion

== Sources ==
- Munoz, Javier Romero. "The Guerra Grande: The War of the Triple Alliance, 1865–1870", in Strategy & Tactics, No. 245 (August/September 2007). ISSN 1040-886X.
- Mendoza, Hugo; Neri Farina, Bernardo; Burián, Pablo León; Caballero Campos, Herib (2013). Curupayty. Colección 150 años de la Guerra Grande / [coord. editorial: Bernardo Neri Farina. Dir. editorial: Pablo León Burián. Dir. de la colección: Herib Caballero Campos]. Asunción: El Lector [u.a.] ISBN 978-99953-1-435-4
- Hooker, Terry D.; Heath, Ian (2008). The Paraguayan war: organisation, warfare, dress and weapons; 252 figures, 60 illustrations, 16 maps. Armies of the nineteenth century: the Americas. Nottingham: Foundry Books. pp. 61–65. ISBN 978-1-901543-15-5
