= Battle of San Francisco order of battle =

The Battle of San Francisco was an engagement during the War of the Pacific (1879–1883) between Chile and the Allied Forces of Peru and Bolivia. It was fought on November 19, 1880, with the forces aligned as follows:

== Abbreviations used ==
=== Military rank ===
- MG = Major general
- BG = Brigadier general
- Col = Colonel
- Ltc = Lieutenant colonel
- Maj = Major
- Cpt = Captain
- Lt = 1st lieutenant

== Chilean North Operations Army ==
General Staff

- Col Emilio Sotomayor Baeza
- Col Arístides Martínez

Division	Regiments, batteries and other units
Division of the Right: Col Martiniano Urriola	1st Infantry Regiment "Buin": Ltc Luis José Ortiz; Civic Naval Artillery Battalion: Col Martiniano Urriola; Valparaíso Municipal Police Battalion: Ltc Jacinto Niño; 1st Artillery Brigade; 1st/2nd Battery: Col Eulogio Villarroel; 1st/2nd Battery: Col Roberto Wood
Division of the Center Col Domingo Amunátegui	4th Line Infantry Regiment: Ltc Domingo Amunátegui; 21st Infantry Regiment "Coquimbo": Ltc Alejandro Gorostiaga; Atacama Battalion: Ltc Juan Martínez; Cazadores de Caballo Regiment: Ltc Pedro Soto Aguilar; Horse Grenadier Company; 3rd Artillery Brigade: José Salvo; 1st/3rd Battery: Cpt Pablo Urízar
Division of the Left Ltc Ricardo Castro	2nd Line Infantry Regiment: Ltc José Velásquez Bórquez; 3rd Line Infantry Regiment: Ltc Ricardo Castro; Cazadores de Caballo Regiment: Ltc Pedro Soto Aguilar; Groups of Pontooners and others: Maj Juan Larraín; 2nd Artillery Brigade: Col Benjamín Montoya; 1st/2nd Battery: Cpt Santiago Frías; 1st/2nd Battery: Cpt Domingo Carvallo

== Southern Peruvian Army ==
General Staff

- MG Juan Buendía
- Col Belisario Suárez

Group	Division	Regiments and others
Western Group; Col Belisario Suárez	1st Division Col Manuel Velarde Seoane	5th Cazadores de Cuzco Battalion; 7th Cazadores de la Guardia Battalion
Western Group; Col Belisario Suárez	2nd Division BG Pedro Villamil	2nd Aroma de Cochabamba Battalion; 3rd Vengadores de Potosí Battalion; Victoria Battalion; Colquechaca Battalion; Husares de Junin Squadron
Western Group; Col Belisario Suárez	3rd Division Col Francisco Bolognesi	2nd Ayacucho Battalion; Guardia de Arequipa Battalion
Eastern Group; MG Juan Buendía	4th Division Col Justo Pastor Dávila	6th Puno Line Battalion: Col Rafael Ramírez; 8th Lima Line Battalion: Col Remigio Morales Bermúdez
Eastern Group; MG Juan Buendía	5th Division BG Pedro Bustamante	3rd Lima Provisional Line Battalion; 1st Ayacucho Battalion: Col Leoncio Prado Gutiérrez
Eastern Group; MG Juan Buendía	1st Division BG Carlos Villegas	2nd Cazadores de la Guardia Battalion; 3rd Paucarpata de La Paz Battalion; 1st Dalence de Oruro Battalion: Col Donato Vásquez
Eastern Group; MG Juan Buendía	Other Regiments	Guias Cavalry Squadron; Castilla Cavalry Squadron; Campaña Artillery Battalion: Ltc Emilio Castañón; 1st Húsares de Bolívar Battalion
Reserves; Col Andrés Avelino Cáceres	2nd Division Col Andrés Avelino Cáceres	2nd Zepita Line Battalion; Dos de Mayo Battalion
