= Hundred Regiments Offensive order of battle =

5-months large scale military operation at the start of the Second World War

Hundred Regiments Offensive

- Aug 20 – Dec 5, 1940

== China ==
18th Group Army – Deputy Commander Peng Dehuai

- 129th Division
  - 47 regiments
- 120th Division
  - 22 regiments
- 115th Division
  - 46 regiments

Total: 115 Regiments, variously estimated between 70,000 and 300,000 men. Actual communist strike regiments exerted to the campaign would total about 22 regiments.

== Japan ==
Japanese Northern China Area Army – Lieutenant General Hayao Tada

- 15th Independent Mixed Brigade [ Hebei, Peiking area]
- 27th Division [ Hebei, Tientsin area]
- 7th Independent Mixed Brigade [ Shandong, Huimin area]
- 110th Division [Hebei, Baoding area]
- 8th Independent Mixed Brigade [Hebei, Shijiazhuang area] - Major General Mizuhara
- 1st Independent Mixed Brigade [Hebei, Handan area]
- Mongolian Army [HQ: Chahar, Zhangjiakou]
  - 26th Division [ Suiyuan, Datong area]
  - 2nd Independent Mixed Brigade [Chahar, Zhangjiakou area]
- 1st Army [ Shanxi, Taiyuan]
  - 36th Division [Shanxi, Lu'an area]
  - 3rd Independent Mixed Brigade [Shanxi, Shanheng (山亨) county area]
  - 4th Independent Mixed Brigade [Shanxi, Yangquan area] - Lieutenant General Katayama
  - 9th Independent Mixed Brigade [Shanxi, Taiyuan area]
  - 41st Division [Shanxi, Linfen area]

Collaborationist Chinese forces

- ?

== Sources ==
- Tetsuya Kataoka, Resistance and Revolution in China, The Communists and the Second United Front, UNIVERSITY OF CALIFORNIA PRESS, Berkeley, Los Angeles, Oxford
  - The Battle of One Hundred Regiments
- [2] 抗日战争时期的侵华日军序列沿革 (Order of battle of the Japanese army that invaded China during the Sino Japanese War)
- [3] RESISTANCE WARS: Hundred Regiment Campaign
