= Battle of Saalfeld order of battle =

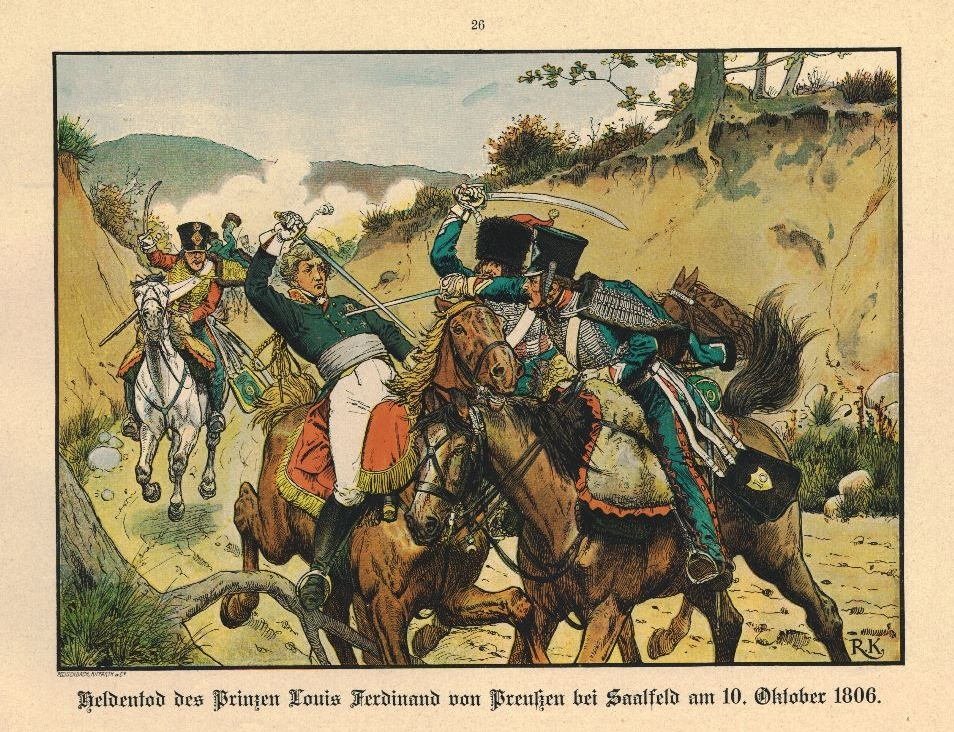
Image of the battle

The Battle of Saalfeld took place on the 10 October 1806. A French force of 12,800 men commanded by Marshal Jean Lannes defeated a Prussian-Saxon force of 8,300 men under Prince Louis Ferdinand.

== French V Corps ==
Commander-in-chief: Marshal Jean Lannes

Chief of staff: Général de Division Claude Victor-Perrin

=== 1st Division ===
Général de Division Louis-Gabriel Suchet

==== 1st Brigade ====
Général de Brigade Michel Marie Claparède

- 1st and 2nd battalions, 17th Légère Regiment (2,047 officers and men)
- Bataillon d’élite (751), formed of carabiniers and voltigeurs of the 3rd battalions of the 17th and 21st Légère, and the grenadiers and voltigeurs of 4th battalion 34th Ligne, 3rd battalions of 40th, 64th, and 88th Ligne.

==== 2nd Brigade ====
Général de Brigade Honoré Charles Reille

- 1st, 2nd, and 3rd battalions, 34th Ligne Regiment (2,788)
- 1st and 2nd battalions, 40th Ligne Regiment (1,881)

==== 3rd Brigade ====
Général de Brigade Dominique Honoré Antoine Vedel

- 1st and 2nd battalions, 64th Ligne Regiment (1,954)
- 1st and 2nd battalions, 88th Ligne Regiment (2,104)

==== Divisional Artillery ====
- 15th company, 5th Foot Artillery Regiment (108)
- 3rd company, 3rd Horse Artillery Regiment (68)

(2x12lb, 6x8lb, 2x4lb cannons, 2x6" howitzers)

=== Cavalry Brigade ===
Général de Brigade Anne-François-Charles Trelliard

- 1st, 2nd, and 3rd squadrons, 9th Hussar Regiment (527)
- 1st, 2nd, and 3rd squadrons, 10th Hussar Regiment (495)
- 1st, 2nd, and 3rd squadrons, 21st Chasseurs à Cheval (608)

Strengths as at 1 October 1806.

== Prussian-Saxon Advanced Guard Division ==
Generalleutenant Prince Louis Ferdinand of Prussia

General staff: Stabskapitän Georg Wilhelm von Valentini

=== Detachment at Blankenburg ===
Generalmajor Karl Gerhard von Pelet

- Fusilier Battalion No. 14 "von Pelet"
- Jäger Company "Masars"
- 3 squadrons, Saxon Hussar Regiment
- ½ Horse Artillery Battery No. 2 "Gause" (4 guns)

=== Troops at Saalfeld ===
Prussian Troops

- Jäger Company "Valentini"
- Fusilier Battalion No. 13 "Rabenau"
- Fusilier Battalion No. 15 "Rühle"
- 5 squadrons, Hussar Regiment No. 6 "Schimmelpfennig von der Oye"
- ½ Horse Artillery Battery No. 2 "Gause" (4 guns)
- 2 battalions, Infantry Regiment No. 49 "Müffling"
- 6lb Foot Artillery Battery "Reimann" (12 guns)

Saxon Troops
Generalmajor Friedrich Traugott von Trützschler

Generalmajor Friedrich Joseph von Bevilaqua

- 5 squadrons, Saxon Hussar Regiment
- 1st and 2nd battalions, Infantry Regiment No. 1 "Kurfürst"
- 1st and 2nd battalions, Infantry Regiment No. 4 "Prinz Clemens"
- 1st and 2nd battalions, Infantry Regiment No. 9 "Prince Xaver"
- 4lb Foot Artillery Battery "Hoyer" (8 guns)

16 additional guns attached to the infantry regiments

=== Detachment at Pößneck ===
Generalmajor Christian Ludwig Schimmelpfennig von der Oye

- 5 squadrons, Hussar Regiment No. 6 "Schimmelpfennig von der Oye"

Total strength 9 October 1806: 7,500 infantry, 2,700 cavalry, 44 guns
