= Battle of Carabobo order of battle =

This is the order of battle for the Battle of Carabobo in 1821 in the Venezuelan War of Independence during the Spanish American wars of independence.
