= Battle of Yungay order of battle =

Order of battle for the Battle of Yungay
| Confederate Army | United Restoration Army |
|---|---|
| Bolivian Division (General Herrera) 1st of Bolivia Battalion (Colonel Fructuoso Peña) 2nd of Bolivia Battalion (Colonel Mariano Sierra) 3rd of Bolivia Battalion (General Pedro Bermudez) 4th of Bolivia Battalion (Colonel Feliciano Deheza) | I Division (General Juan Crisóstomo Torrico) Santiago Battalion (Colonel Sessé) Aconcagua Battalion (Colonel Silva) Valdivia Battalion (Colonel Gómez) |
| Division North and South Peruvian (General José Trinidad Moran) Ayacucho Battalion (Colonel Agustín Morales) Pichincha Battalion (Colonel Carrasco) Arequipa Battalion (Colonel Gil Espino) Light Infantry Battalion Center Rifles(Colonel José Gabriel Téllez) | II Division (General Juan Bautista Eléspuru) Carampangue Battalion (Colonel Jerónimo Valenzuela) Portales Battalion (Colonel Manuel García Banqueda) Peruvian Rifles Battalion (Colonel Deustua) |
| Pan de Azucar hill Garrison (Colonel Anselmo Quiroz) Light Infantry Battalion Bolivian Rifles (Colonel Anselmo Quiroz) | III Division (General Juan Francisco de Vidal) Valparaíso Battalion (Colonel Vidaurre-Leal) Colchagua Battalion (Colonel Urriola) Huaylas Battalion (Colonel Vivero) |
| Cavalry Division (General Pérez de Urdininea) Escolta Regiment Lanceros de Bolivia Regiment | IV Cavalry Division (General Ramón Castilla) Horse Grenadier Regiment (Colonel Manuel Jarpa) Mounted Rifle Regiment (Colonel Fernando Baquedano) Lancer Squadron (Colonel Frisancho) Carabineros Squadron (Commander José Ignacio García) |
