= Amoy Operation order of battle =

Below is the order of battle for the Amoy Operation fought May 10–12, 1938, part of a campaign by the Imperial Japanese Navy to blockade the Republic of China during the Second Sino-Japanese War.

== Japan ==
5th Fleet
Vice Admiral Koichi Shiozawa

9th Sentai

1 Myōkō-class heavy cruiser (10 × 8-in. main battery, 16 × 24-in. torpedo tubes, 33.75 knots)

Myōkō

1 Kuma-class light cruiser (7 × 5.5-in. main battery, 8 × 24-in. torpedo tubes, 31.75 knots):

Tama

10th Sentai

2 Tenryū-class light cruisers (4 × 5.5-in. main battery, 6 × 21-in. torpedo tubes, 33 knots):

Tenryū
Tatsuta

1st Gunboat Unit

4 gunboats(?)

1st Air Sentai

Fleet carrier Kaga

90 aircraft

Fighter Daitai: Nakajima A2N, Type 95 Mitsubishi A5M
Bomber Daitai: Aichi D1A1s, A2's dive bombers
Attack Daitai: Mitsubishi B2M, Type 96 Yokosuka B4Y1 torpedo bombers

3rd Air Sentai

Kamoi seaplane tender

12 aircraft (probably Nakajima E8N Type 95 "Dave" Recon Seaplane)

2nd Combined SNLF

Yokosuka 2nd SNLF
Kure 3rd SNLF
Sasebo 7th SNLF

Kinmen (Quemoy) Garrison
1st Garrison Unit

=== Notes ===
1. Earlier in the Shanghai campaign the 1st Air Sentai had an escort of a 30th Tai of 4 destroyers. Formerly Kamoi had an escort of 28th Tai of 4 destroyers also. It is likely they had similar if not the same escorts here.
2. From: History of The Sino-Japanese War (1937–1945)
  5/10 11 Ships and 18 planes bombarded Ho-to and Ao-tou. 20 motor boats landed infantry at Wu-tung.
  5/11 More landings at Huang-tso and Ta-tao. 3 destroyers and 2 Gunboats attacked the fortress there to cover the landings. This indicates there was at least one Tai of destroyers with this operation.

== China ==
Amoy Area
Chen Yi, Director, Fukien Pacification HQ

75th Division – Han Wen-ying
Amoy fortress Command – Kao Hsien-shen

Pai-shih Fortress
Yu-tse-wei Fortress (naval garrison)

2 batteries of fortress garrison forces

Hui-li-shan battery
Pan-shih battery

== Sources ==
- Madej, W. Victor (1981). Japanese Armed Forces Order of Battle, 1937-1945 [2 vols]. Allentown, PA.
- "Axis History forum: The Sino-Japanese War(Campaigns in detail)".
- "Axis History forum: OOB IJN Amphibious Assault Xiamen (Amoy) May 10, 1938] Maps, narrative, oob info and discussion".
