= Battle of Viluma order of battle =

This is the order of battle for the Battle of Viluma, also known as the Battle of Sipe-Sipe, during the Spanish American wars of independence.

== See also ==
- Battle of Viluma
