= Operation Savannah (Angola) order of battle: South Africa =

South African Defense Force operation

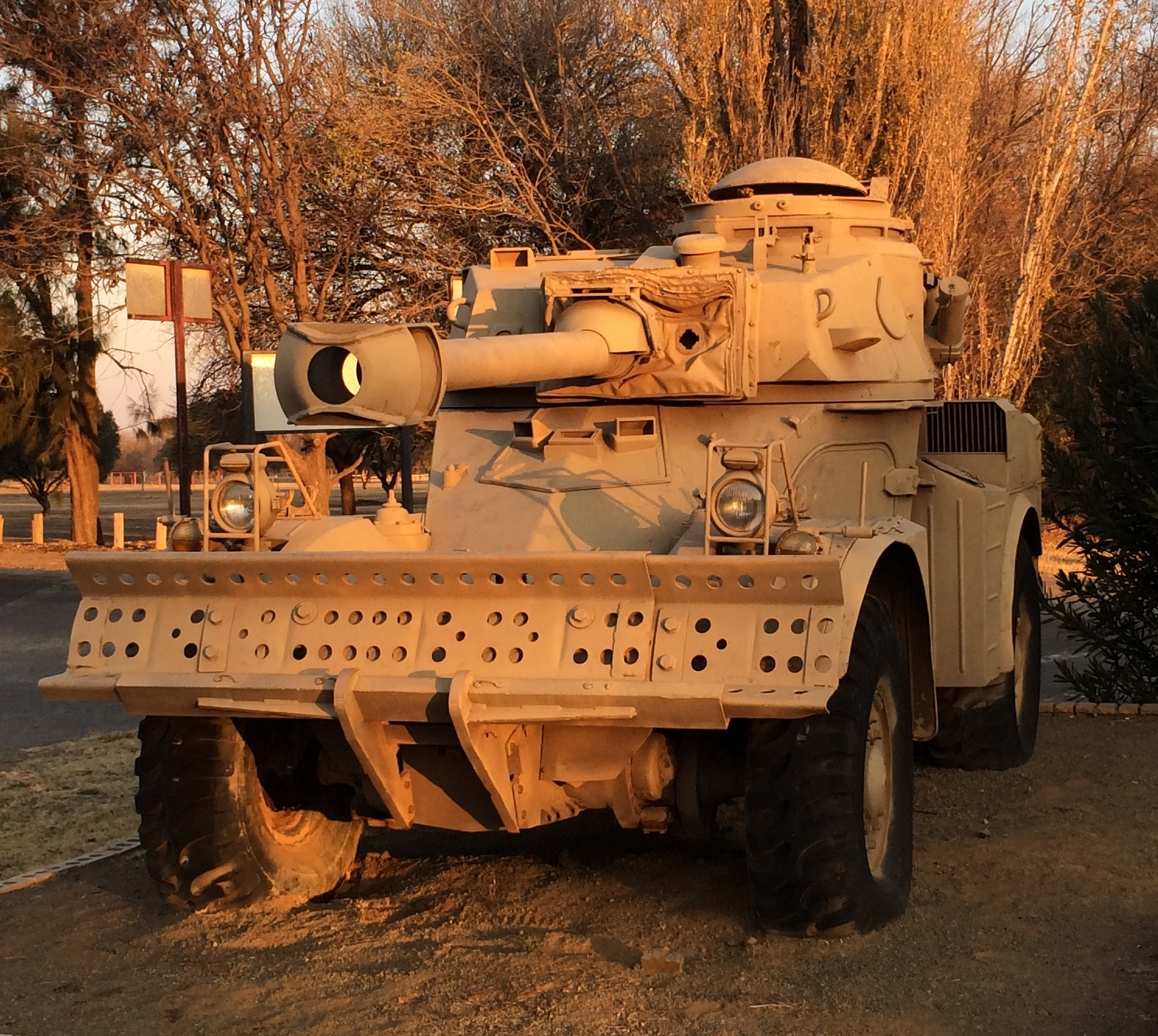
Savannah's workhorse, the ubiquitous Eland armoured car

The South African Defence Force deployed a number of Combat Groups comprising South African and Angolan elements during Operation Savannah (Angola). Initially, only Combat Groups A and B were deployed, with the remaining groups being mobilised and deployed into Angola later in the campaign. There has been much dispute the overall size of Task Force Zulu. Current evidence indicates that the Task Force started with approximately 500 men and grew to a total of 2,900 with the formation of Battle Groups Foxbat, Orange and X-Ray.

Note: Armoured cars and artillery batteries were frequently reassigned between Combat Groups depending on the nature of the task on hand.

== Task Force Zulu ==
- Task force commander: Col Koos van Heerden
- Combat Group Alpha
  - Commander: Cmdt. Dellville Lindford until 20 December 1975, thereafter Cmdt. P.C. Myburgh
    - 1x Fletcha Battalion
    - 1x Caprivi Bushman Company
    - 1x Angolan Bushman Company
    - 2x Troops Eland-90 armoured cars
    - 1x 81mm mortar platoon
    - 1x Battery 140mm artillery
- Combat Group Bravo
  - Commander: Cmdt. Jan Breytenbach
    - 1x Battalion Chipenda faction ex FNLA soldiers
    - 3x Troop Eland-90 armoured Cars
    - 1x Troop 25-pound howitzer
    - 1x Battery (3 guns) 140mm howitzer

== Independent Combat Groups ==
=== Foxbat ===
- Task force commander: Cmdt. Eddie Webb (Maj H. Holtzhausen at time of establishment) and later Cmdt. George Kruys
  - Several hundred UNITA soldiers
  - 3x Entac AT missile vehicles
  - 3x UNITA AML-90 armoured cars
  - 2x Sabre Land Rovers mounted with twin .50" Browning
  - 1x Squadron Eland 90 Armoured Cars

=== Orange ===
- Commander Cmdt. Dolf Carstens
  - 1x UNITA Battalion
  - 1x Motorised Infantry Company B Coy - 2 SAI
  - 1x Squadron Eland-90 armoured cars
  - 1xTroop 140mm artillery
  - 1x Platoon Medium Machine Gun HQ Coy - 2 SAI
  - 1x Company Zaire Army

=== X-Ray ===
- Commander: Capt. Fred Rindel
  - 1x UNITA Battalion
  - 1x SADF Infantry Company
  - 1x Squadron Eland-90 and Eland 60 armoured (22 cars) cars
