= Landing at Saidor order of battle =

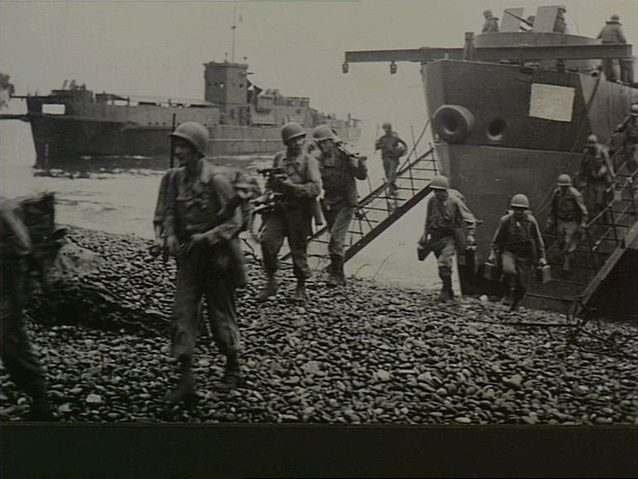
US forces landing at Saidor, 7 January 1944

This is the order of battle of Allied and Japanese forces during the Landing at Saidor in 1944.

== Allied forces ==
The Allied Task Force MICHAELMAS consisted of:

- 126th Infantry Regimental Combat Team (under Brigadier general Clarence A. Martin; Colonel Joseph S. Bradley as Chief of Staff)
  - 126th Infantry Regiment
  - 120th Field Artillery Battalion
  - Company A, 114th Engineer Battalion
  - Company C and 1st Platoon of Company B, 632nd Tank Destroyer Battalion
  - Company A and a platoon of Company D, 107th Medical Battalion
  - Detachment of 32nd Quartermaster Company
  - Detachment of 732nd Ordnance Company
  - Detachment of Military Police Platoon, 32nd Infantry Division
- Headquarters and Headquarters Battery, 191st Field Artillery Group
- Batteries B and D, 209th Coast Artillery Battalion (Automatic Weapons)
- Headquarters and Headquarters Battery, and Batteries A and D, 743rd Coast Artillery Battalion (Gun) (Anti Aircraft)
- Detachment, 8th Engineer Survey Squadron
- Shore Battalion, 542nd Engineer Boat and Shore Regiment
- Company B, 542nd Engineer Boat and Shore Regiment
- Detachment, 93rd Chemical Composite Company
- 5th Portable Surgical Hospital
- 23rd Field Hospital
- One section of Company C, 543rd Quartermaster Service Battalion
- One section of 2nd Platoon, 601st Graves Registration Company
- Detachment, 32nd Signal Company
- Company C, 262nd Medical Supply Battalion
- Detachment, Australian New Guinea Administrative Unit (Australian Army)
- 2nd Combat Assignment Unit (Photo)
- 121st Field Artillery Battalion
- 27th Medical Supply Platoon (Aviation)
- Company C (collecting), 135th Medical Regiment
- 1st Platoon, 670th Clearing Company
- 808th Engineer Aviation Battalion
- Battery A, less one platoon, 236th Anti Aircraft Artillery Searchlight Battalion
- 3rd Platoon, 453rd Engineer Depot Company
- 21st Ordnance Company, plus attachments
- Detachment of Company A, 60th Signal Battalion
- 863rd Engineer Aviation Battalion
- One platoon of 189th Gasoline Supply Company
- 5th Malaria Survey Unit,
- 15th Malaria Control Unit

The following were attached to the Task Force:

- 10th Air Liaison Party (USAAF)
- Naval Beach party (USN)
- Detachment, 15th Weather Squadron (USAAF)
- Detachment, 21st Fighter Sub Sector (USAAF)
- Assault Echelon, Company B, 583rd Signal Aircraft Warning Battalion (USAAF)
- Radar Repair Team, B-12 (USAAF)

The following were later assigned:

- 860th Engineer Aviation Battalion (less Companies B and C and HQ and Survey Company)
- 1st and 3rd Battalion Combat Teams, 128th Infantry Regimental Combat Team
- 18th Portable Surgical Hospital,

== Japanese forces ==
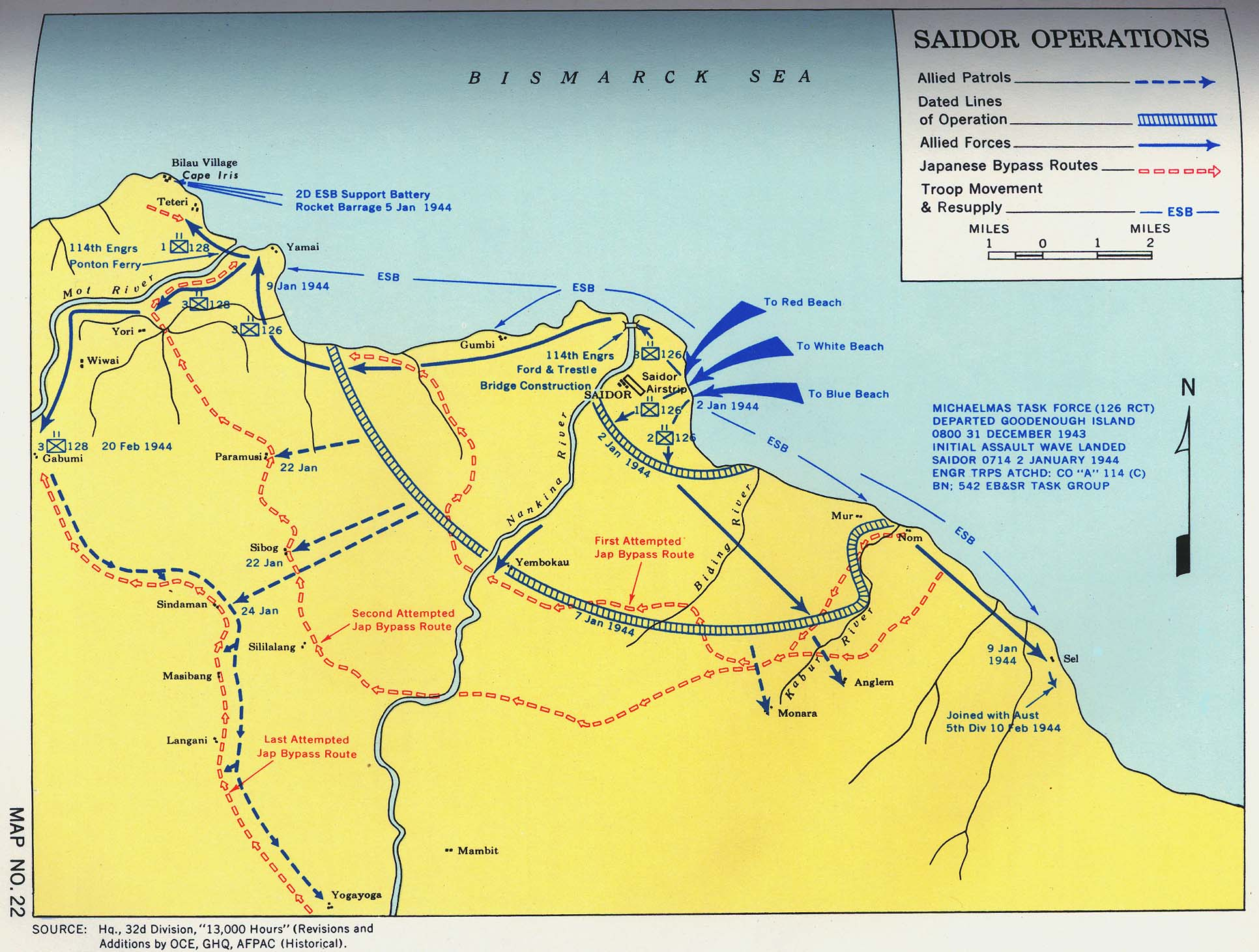
Saidor Operation, January 1944.

The Japanese forces engaged in the area consisted of:

- 20th Division
  - 79th Infantry Regiment
  - 80th Infantry Regiment
  - 20th Engineer Regiment
  - 20th Transport Regiment
  - 26th Field Artillery Regiment (2nd and 3rd Battalions)
  - Field Hospital
- 51st Division
  - 61st Infantry Regiment
  - 85th Convoy Group (Naval)
  - 5th Shipping Engineer Regiment
  - 8th Shipping Engineer Regiment
  - 33rd Engineer Regiment
  - Independent Mortar battalion
- 41st Division
  - 238th Infantry Regiment
