= First Battle of Târgu Frumos order of battle =

This is the order of battle for the First Battle of Târgu Frumos (early April 1944), a World War II Soviet offensive against Axis powers in Târgu Frumos, Romania.

== Soviet ==
- 2nd Tank Army, Lieutenant-General Semen Bogdanov
- 27th Army, Lieutenant-General Sergei Trofimenko
  - 35th Guards Rifle Corps, Lieutenant-General Sergey Goryachev
    - 3rd Guards Airborne Division
    - 93rd Guards Rifle Division
    - 202nd Rifle Division
    - 206th Rifle Division
- 40th Army, Lieutenant-General Filipp Zhmachenko
  - 51st Rifle Corps, Major-General P.P. Avdeenko
    - 42nd Guards Rifle Division

== Axis ==
=== German ===
- 8th Army, General der Infanterie Otto Wöhler
  - Grossdeutschland Panzer Grenadier Division, General der Panzertruppe Hasso von Manteuffel
    - Panzer Regiment
    - Panzer Grenadier Regiment
    - Panzer Fusilier Regiment

=== Romanian ===
- 4th Army, Lieutenant-General Ioan Mihail Racoviță
  - 1st Army Corps
    - 6th Infantry Division
  - 4th Army Corps
    - 1st Guards Division
    - 7th Infantry Division
