= Invasion of France (1795) order of battle =

The invasion of France in 1795 or the Battle of Quiberon was a major landing on the Quiberon peninsula by émigré, counter-revolutionary troops in support of the Chouannerie and Vendée Revolt, beginning on 23 June and finally definitively repulsed on 21 July. It aimed to raise the whole of western France in revolt, bring an end to the French Revolution and restore the French monarchy. The invasion failed; it had a major negative impact, dealing a disastrous blow to the royalist cause.

== Army of the West (Republican) ==
The Army of the West (Armée de l'Ouest) had been disbanded in late 1793 after the end of the War in the Vendée, but hastily reformed during the invasion from elements of the following; Armée du Côtes de Brest, Armée du Côtes de Normandie, and the Armée du Nord. During the invasion, the army was led by famed Général Lazare Hoche.

Cavalry

- 24éme Régiment de Cavalerie
- 2éme Régiment de Dragons
- 16éme Régiment de Dragons
- 19éme Régiment de Dragons
- 7éme Régiment de Chasseurs à Cheval
- 14éme Régiment de Chasseurs à Cheval
- 15éme Régiment de Chasseurs à Cheval

Infantry

- 10éme Demi-Brigade de Ligne
- 12éme Demi-Brigade de Ligne
- 15éme Demi-Brigade de Ligne
- 17éme Demi-Brigade de Ligne
- 28éme Demi-Brigade de Ligne
- 40éme Demi-Brigade de Ligne
- 61éme Demi-Brigade de Ligne
- 67éme Demi-Brigade de Ligne
- 85éme Demi-Brigade de Ligne
- 107éme Demi-Brigade de Ligne
- 171éme Demi-Brigade de Ligne
- 183éme Demi-Brigade de Ligne
- 196éme Demi-Brigade de Ligne
- 197éme Demi-Brigade de Ligne
- Demi-Brigade de Gers et Bayonne
- Demi-Brigade de Gironde et Lot-et-Garonne
- Demi-Brigade de Paris et Vosges
- Demi-Brigade de Deux-Sèvres

Artillery

- 5éme Régiment d'Artillerie à Cheval
- 1ére Compagnie d'Artillerie Volante du 5éme Régiment d'Artillerie à Pied
- Garrison Companies, 5éme Régiment d'Artillerie à Pied

== Army of Charette (Royalist) ==
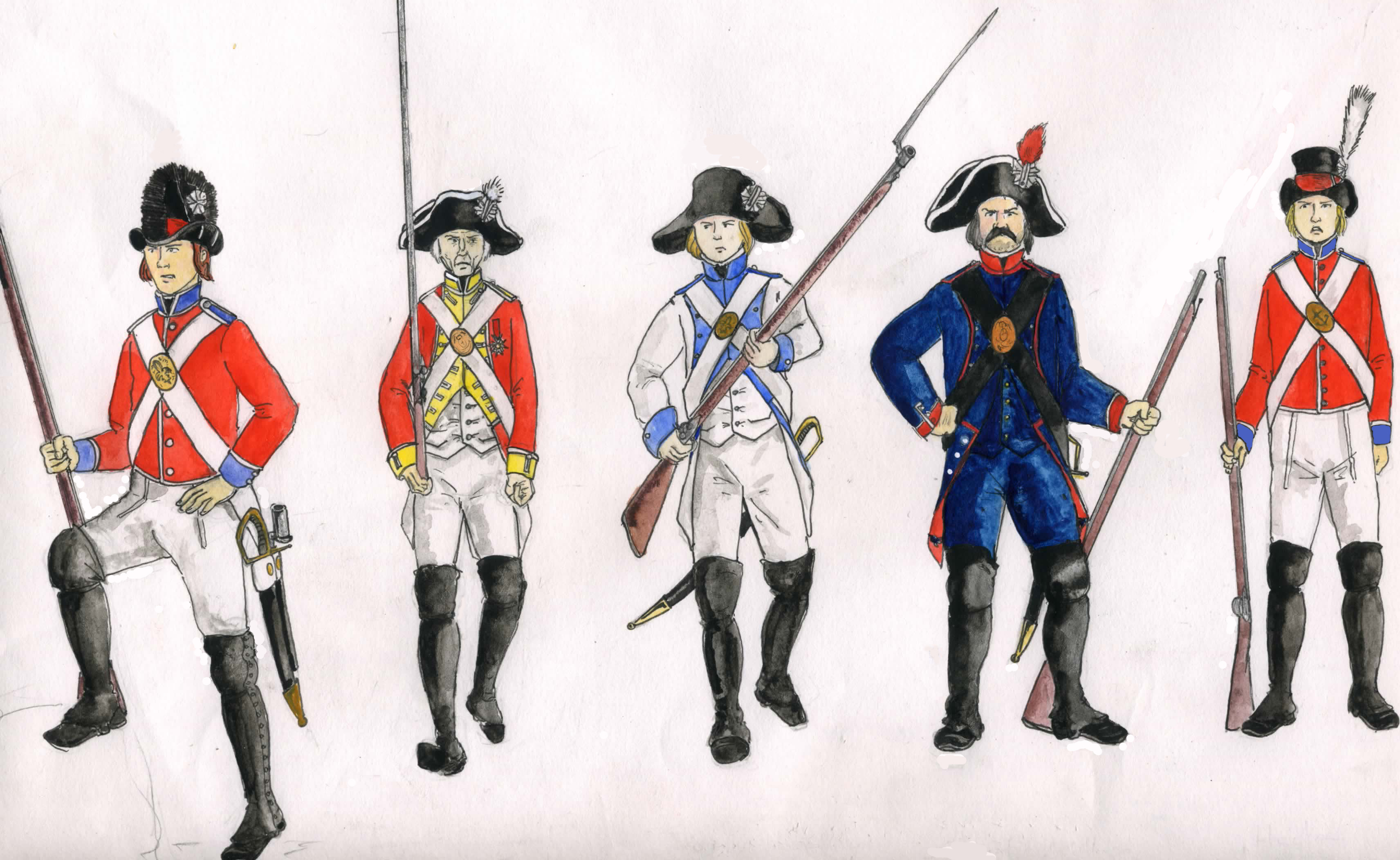
Five Royalist soldiers (left to right): Dresnay Regiment, Loyal Emigrant Regiment, Hervilly Regiment, Royal Artillery and Royal Marine Regiment

Troops below (if applicable) include the main/secondary nationalities. It is quickly worth noting most "regiments", didn't even reach 700 men in most cases. Also, of the few men actually involved, the majority had been Republican prisoners and would desert en masse.

- Commander, François Athanase, Baron de Charette
- Unknown force commanded by d'Hervilly

Cavalry

- Hussards de Choieseul – French/Belgian
- Hussards de Warren

Légions (typically Cavalry & Infantry)

- Légion de Béon – French/Dutch

Infantry

- Régiment d'Émigrants Loyaux (La Châtre) – Formed the Advance-Guard during the Invasion
- Régiment du Dresnay
- Régiment d'Hervilly (2 Battalions)
- Régiment d'Hector (Marine Royale)
- Régiment de Léon
- Régiment de Damas
- Régiment de Williamson
- Infanterie Légère Salm–Kirbourg – German/French
- Infanterie Légère de Rohan – German
- Infanterie Légère de Perigord

Artillery

- Artillerie des Émigrants de Rotalier

== British Armed Forces ==
Though never fully involved, the below units were sent with the royalists into Brittany to provide a rear guard and support if needed.

Royal Navy

- Sir Sidney Smith's Squadron — Deployed off the coast of Normandy, making feint attacks on coastal forts as a distraction
- Sir Richard Strahan, 6th Baronet's Squadron — Deployed off the coast of Brittany
- Lord Bridport's Squadron — Providing close support to the transport ships

British Army

The below force was due to deploy to Brittany, but never actually arrived for many reasons, though the reason being the inability for the transport group to leave port due to foul weather. After finally being able to set sail, the group retrieved news of the Quiberon disaster, and was withdrawn immediately.

- British Support Force: commanded by General Francis Rawdon-Hastings, Earl of Moira, 1st Marquess of Hastings
  - 4th (Royal Irish) Dragoon Guards
  - 19th (1st Yorkshire North Riding) Regiment of Foot
  - 40th (2nd Somersetshire) Regiment of Foot — battalion coys only,
  - 42nd (Royal Highland) Regiment of Foot
  - 1st Battalion, 78th (Highlands) Regiment of Foot (the Ross-shire Buffs)
