= Samuel H. Cook =

- Military career
- Allegiance: United States
- Branch: United States Volunteers; Colorado Militia
- Rank: Captain
- Commands: F Company, 1st Colorado Infantry
- Conflicts: Bleeding Kansas American Civil War: Battle of Glorieta Pass; Indian Wars

Samuel H. Cook was a Union officer who served as a captain in the American Civil War. A veteran of the fighting in Kansas, in 1861 he started recruiting volunteers in Denver to form a unit of soldiers to head east and fight against the Confederacy. However, Governor William Gilpin of the Colorado Territory, offering funds to raise the unit, persuaded him to stay and help raise the 1st Regiment of Colorado Volunteers. Chivington's recruits formed the core of the new unit. Major John Chivington was placed in command of the unit and Captain Cook commanded the cavalry of F Company. At the Battle of Glorieta Pass, Cook was wounded at Apache Canyon.
