= Lushai Expedition order of battle =

The following is the order of battle for the Lushai Expedition (1871-1872).

== Lushai Field Force ==
Cachar (Left) Column

- General George Bouchier
  - Half Peshawar Mountain Battery (Captain Blackwood RA)
  - No 1 Coy Sappers & Miners (Lt Harvey RE)
  - 500 22nd Punjaub Native Infantry (Colonel Stafford)
  - 500 42nd Assam Light Infantry (Colonel Rattray CB)
  - 500 44th Assam Light Infantry (Colonel Hicks)
  - 100 Police (Mr Daly)
  - Column support
    - 1440 coolies (Lieutenant-Colonel Davidson)
    - 800 coolies (sepoys baggage, Major Moore)
    - 121 elephants
    - Senior Staff Officer Frederick Sleigh Roberts
    - Brigade Major Captain Thomas
    - Aide-de-Camp Captain Butter
    - Inspector General of Hospitals Dr Buckle
    - Political officer John Edgar
    - Assistant Political officer Mr Burland
    - Topographical Survey (Captain Badgley)
    - Telegraph (Mr Pitman)

Chittagong (Right) Column

- Brigader-General Charles Henry Brownlow
  - Half Peshawar Mountain Battery (Colonel James Hill)
  - No 3 Coy Sappers & Miners
  - 500 27th Punjaub Native Infantry
  - 500 2nd Gurkhas (Colonel H. Macpherson)
  - 500 4th Gurkhas (Colonel Tytler)
  - Support
    - Political officer (Thomas Herbert Lewin)
    - Assistant political officer (Mr Crouch)
    - Medical Officer 2nd Gurkha (Dr Allen)
    - Assistant Quartermaster-General (Captain East)

Manipur Contingent

- Brigadier William Frost Nuthall
  - 1552 Manipuri troops (Major Sewai Chumba, Major Thangal)
  - 530 Kuki Contingent
  - 1749 coolies

== Sources ==
- Chatterjee, Suhas (1990). Mizo Encyclopaedia. Aizawl: Jaico Publishing House.
- FIBIS (21 July 2008). "Lushai Expedition". Families in British India Society.
- Lewin, Thomas Herbert (1885). A fly on the wheel: Or, how I helped to govern India. London: W.H. Allen & Co.
- Singh, N. Lokendra (9 June 2020). "A Brief Note on Manipur and the Lushai Expedition, 1871-1872". The Sangai Express. Manipur.
- Reid, A.S. (1893). Chin-Lushai Land: Including a description of the various expeditions into the Chin-Lushai Hills and the final annexation of the country. Calcutta: Thacker, Spink and Co.
- Roberts, Frederick Sleigh (1898). Forty-One years in India from Subaltern to Commander in Chief. London: Richard Bentley and Son.
- Woodthorpe, Robert Gosset (1873), The Lushai expedition, 1871-1872, London: Hurst and Blackett
