= Structure of the Hellenic Army =

== General Staff ==
- Hellenic Army General Staff
  Γενικό Επιτελείο Στρατού (ΓΕΣ)
- Chief-of-Staff of the Army
  Αρχηγός ΓΕΣ
- Inspector General of the Army
  Γενικός Επιθεωρητής Στρατού / Διοικητής ΔΙΔΟΕΕ
- 1st Deputy Chief-of-Staff of the Army
  A' Υπαρχηγός ΓΕΣ
- 2nd Deputy Chief-of-Staff of the Army
  Β' Υπαρχηγός ΓΕΣ

== Branches of the Army ==
- Combat and Combat Support branches are called Arms (Όπλον).
- Service Support and Logistic Support branches are called Corps (Σώμα).
- The Logistic Support branches do not have units.

== Combat Arms (Όπλα Μάχης) ==
- Infantry Arm (includes Special Forces)
  Όπλον Πεζικού (ΠΖ)
  Ειδικές Δυνάμεις (ΕΔ) - Special Forces including commandos, paratroopers and marines.
- Armor - Cavalry Arm
  Όπλον Ιππικού-Τεθωρακισμένων (ΤΘ)
- Artillery Arm
  Όπλον Πυροβολικού (ΠΒ)

== Combat Support Arms (Όπλα υποστήριξης μάχης) ==
- Αrmy Aviation Arm
  Όπλον Αεροπορίας Στρατού (ΑΣ)
- Engineers Arm
  Όπλον Μηχανικού (ΜΧ)
- Signals Arm
  Όπλον Διαβιβάσεων (ΔΒ)

== Service Support Corps (Σώματα Υποστήριξης Μάχης) ==
- Technical Corps
  Σώμα Τεχνικού (ΤΧ)
- Supply and Transportation Corps
  Σώμα Εφοδιασμού Μεταφορών (ΕΜ)
- Ordnance Corps
  Σώμα Υλικού Πολέμου (ΥΠ)
- Medical Corps
  Σώμα Υγειονομικού (ΥΓ)
- Research and Informatics Corps
  Σώμα Έρευνας Πληροφορικής (ΕΠ)

== Logistic Corps (Σώματα Διοικητικής Μέριμνας) ==
- Finance Corps
  Σώμα Οικονομικού (Ο)
- Audit Corps
  Σώμα Ελεγκτικού (Ε)
- Post Office Corps
  Σώμα Ταχυδρομικού (ΤΔ)
- Quartermaster Corps
  Σώμα Φροντιστών
- Medical Logistic and Administrative personnel Corps
  Σώμα Διαχειριστών Διοικητικών Υγειονομικού
- Music Corps
  Μουσικό Σώμα
- Arms Master Technicians Corps
  Σώμα Αρχιτεχνικών Οπλων
- Corps Master Technicians Corps
  Σώμα Αρχιτεχνικών Σωμάτων
- Geography Corps
  Γεωγραφικό Σώμα
- Military Secretaries and Translators Corps
  Σώμα Στρατιωτικών Γραμματέων - Διερμηνέων
