= Battle of Big Bethel order of battle =

The following Union Army and Confederate States Army units and commanders fought in the Battle of Big Bethel on June 10, 1861 during the American Civil War.

== Abbreviations used ==
=== Military rank ===
- MG = Major General
- BG = Brigadier General
- Col = Colonel
- Ltc = Lieutenant Colonel
- Maj = Major
- Cpt = Captain
- Lt = Lieutenant

=== Other ===
- (w) = wounded
- (mw) = mortally wounded
- (k) = killed in action
- (c) = captured

== Confederate forces ==
Col John B. Magruder, Commander of the Hampton Division (1404 men)

- Acting Quartermaster: William R. Vaughan
- Acting Commissary: Robert H. Vaughan
- Volunteer Aide-de-camp: George A. Magruder, jr.
- Volunteer Aide-de-camp: Hugh Stannard

Brigade	Regiments and Others
Hill's Command Col Daniel Harvey Hill: Volunteer Aide-de-camp: James W. Ratchford	1st North Carolina Volunteers (800 men): Col D.H. Hill, Ltc Charles C. Lee; 3rd Virginia Infantry (3 Coys, 208 men): Ltc William D. Stuart; Montague's (Virginia) Battalion (4 Coys, 140 men): Maj Edgar B. Montague; Richmond (Virginia) Howitzers (2 Coys, 150 men): Maj George W. Randolph; Peninsula Cavalry (2 Coys, 100 men): Maj John Bell Hood; Mecklenburg Dragoons (Coy): Cpt William N. Jones; Wythe Rifles (Coy, 28): Lt Samuel R. Chisman

== Union forces ==
MG Benjamin Butler, Commander of the Department of Virginia (4400 men)

- Military Secretary: Maj Richard S. Fay
- Volunteer Aide-de-camp: Maj Theodore Winthrop (k)

Brigade	Regiments and Others
Peirce's Command BG Ebenezer W. Peirce: Aide-de-camp: Cpt Peter Haggerty	1st New York Infantry (750 men): Col William H. Allen; 2nd New York Infantry (750 men): Col Joseph B. Carr; 3rd New York Infantry (650 men): Col Frederick Townsend; 5th New York Infantry (850 men): Col Abram Duryée; 7th New York Infantry (750 men): Col John E. Bendix; 1st Vermont Infantry (5 Coys, 300 men): Ltc Peter T. Washburn; 4th Massachusetts Infantry (5 Coys, 300 men): Maj Horace O. Wittemore; 2nd U.S. Artillery (Coy B, 50 men): Lt John Trout Greble (k)
