= Battle of Tolentino order of battle =

This is an order of battle for the Battle of Tolentino that was fought on 2–3 May 1815.

== Austrian Army ==

Commander-in-chief: Lieutenant Field Marshal Baron Bianchi

Total strength: 11,938 men – 1,452 horses – 28 guns

=== I Corps ===
Commander: Lieutenant Field Marshal Baron Mohr

General staff: Colonel Baron Fleischer, Major Kunerth, Captain Auer, Captain Muhlruer, Captain Potier

==== 1st Brigade ====
Commander: General Count Staheremberg

General staff: Captain Spanoghi, Lieutenant Moker

- Pioneers Company No. 1 "Radinski" (161 men)
- Tyrolean Jäger Battalion No. 9 (1,043 men)
- 4¾ Squadrons, Hungarian Hussar Regiment No. 5 "Prince Regent of England" (441 men and horses)
- 1 Battalion, Grenz Infantry Regiment No. 61 "Saint-Julien" (400 men)
- Artillery (6 guns, 102 men and 99 horses)

Total: 2,147 men – 540 horses – 6 guns

==== 2nd Brigade ====
Commander: General Baron Senitzer

General Staff: General Staab, Major Startenthal, Captain Weingarten

- 2 Battalions, Line Infantry Regiment No. 2 "Hiller" (1,971 men)
- 2 Battalions, Line Infantry Regiment No. 43 "Simbschen" (1,848 men)
- 1 Battalion, Grenz Infantry Regiment No. 62 "Wacquant-Geozelles" (969 men)
- Artillery (8 guns, 132 men and 70 horses)

Total: 4,920 men – 70 horses – 8 guns

==== 3rd Brigade ====
Commander: General Baron Ekhardt

- 3 Battalions, Line Infantry Regiment No. 3 "Archduke Charles" (2,426 men)
- 2 Battalions, Line Infantry Regiment No. 27 "Chasteler" (1,490 men)
- Artillery (8 guns, 132 men and 70 horses)

Total: 4,048 men – 70 horses – 8 guns

==== 4th Brigade ====
Commander: General Baron Taxis

- 5½ Squadrons, Royal Dragoon Regiment "Grand Duke Ferdinand of Tuscany" (726 men and horses)
- Artillery (6 guns, 97 men and 46 horses)

Total: 823 men – 772 horses – 6 guns

== Neapolitan Army ==

Commander-in-chief: King Joachim Murat of Naples

General staff: General Prince Campana, General Costa, General De Medici, Captain Caselli

Total strength: 25,588 men – 4,790 horses – 58 guns

=== Guard Divisions ===
Captain of the Guard: Lieutenant General Millet de Villeneuve

==== Infantry of the Guard ====
Commander: General Prince Pignatelli Strongoli

- 1st Velites Regiment (925 men)
- 2nd Velites Regiment (1,064 men)
- Voltigeurs (1,236 men)
- 2nd Artillery Regiment 540 men
- Artillery (10 guns, 126 men and 250 horses)
- Baggage Train (153 men)

Total: 4,044 men – 250 horses – 10 guns

==== Cavalry of the Guard ====
Commander: General Livron

- Hussars of the Guard (426 men and 556 horses)
- Mounted Chasseurs of the Guard (200 men and horses)
- Chevau-légers of the Guard (398 men and 447 horses)
- Lancers of the Guard (313 men and 340 horses)
- Artillery (8 guns, 106 men and 135 horses)
- Baggage Train (133 men)

Total: 1,576 men – 1,894 horses – 10 guns

=== 2nd Infantry Division ===
Commander: General Ambrosio

- 3rd Light Infantry Regiment (2,203 men)
- 2nd Line Infantry Regiment (2,096 men)
- 6th Line Infantry Regiment (2,147 men)
- 9th Line Infantry Regiment (1,438 men)
- Artillery (10 guns, 207 men and 210 horses)
- Baggage Train (138 men)

Total: 8,229 men – 210 horses – 10 guns

=== 3rd Infantry Division ===
Commander: General Lechi

- 1st Light Infantry Regiment (2,060 men)
- 4th Line Infantry Regiment (2,045 men)
- 7th Line Infantry Regiment (1,843 men)
- 8th Line Infantry Regiment (2,062 men)
- Artillery (10 guns, 205 men and 220 horses)
- Baggage Train (140 men)

Total: 8,010 men – 220 horses – 10 guns

=== 4th Infantry Division ===
Commander: General Pignatelli Cerchiara

- 4th Light Infantry Regiment (800 men)
- 10th, 11th and 12th Line Infantry Regiments (1,100 men)
- Cavalry Reserve (500 horses)

Total: 1,900 men – 500 horses

=== Cavalry Division ===
Commander: General Rossetti

- 1st Chevau-légers Regiment (242 men and 228 horses)
- 2nd Chevau-légers Regiment (628 men and 592 horses)
- 3rd Chevau-légers Regiment (563 men and 530 horses)
- 4th Chevau-légers Regiment (416 men and 366 horses)

Total: 1,849 men – 1,716 horses
