= Battle of La Hogaza order of battle =

The order of battle for the Battle of La Hogaza, on December 2, 1817, in the Venezuelan War of Independence during the Spanish American wars of independence proceeded as follows:
