= Battle of Petrovaradin order of battle =

This is the order of battle for the Battle of Petrovaradin which was fought between Habsburg and Ottoman forces on July 5, 1716.

== Order of battle ==
=== Imperial (Austrian) Army ===
Field Marshal Prince Eugene of Savoy

==== 1st Line ====
Lieutenant Field Marshal Freiherr von Falkenstein
General of Cavalry Carl Alexandre Herzog von Wurttemberg
General of Cavalry Florentin Clemens Graf von Mercy

Division	Regiments and Others
Infantry Division	Sigbert Graf von Heister Infantry Regiment (three battalions); Tobias Freiherr von Hasslingen Infantry Regiment (one battalion); Janos Graf von Palffy-Erdodi Infantry Regiment (two battalions); Eberhard Ludwig Herzog von Wurttemberg (Alt) Infantry Regiment (three battalions); General of Cavalry Carl Alexandre Herzog von Wurttemberg Infantry Regiment (three battalions)
Infantry Division General of Infantry Maximilian Ludwig von Regal	Major General Heinrich Reichard Lorenz Graf von und zu Daun (Alt) Infantry Regiment (three battalions); Major General Wilhelm Reinhard Graf von Neipperg Infantry Regiment (two battalions); Freiherr von Wetzel Infantry Regiment (three battalions); General of Infantry Maximilian Ludwig Graf von Regal Infantry Regiment (three battalions); Carl Wilhelm Markgraf Baden-Durlach Infantry Regiment (two battalions)
Infantry Division General of Infantry Max Adam Graf von Starhemberg	General of Infantry Max Adam Graf von Starhemberg Infantry Regiment (three battalions); Graf Scipio Bagni Infantry Regiment (three battalions); Johann Maria Geschwind von Pockstein Infantry Regiment (two battalions); Johann Damian Philipp Freiherr von Sickingen Infantry Regiment; Guido von Starhemberg Infantry Regiment (three battalions)
Cavalry Division	Amadeus Graf Rabutin de Bussy Dragoon Regiment (seven squadrons); de Battee Dragoon Regiment (seven squadrons); Johann Franz Graf von Gronsfeld-Brokhorst Dragoon Regiment (seven squadrons); Janos Graf von Palffy-Erdodi Cuirassier Regiment (seven squadrons)
Cavalry Division Major General Andreas Graf von Hamilton	General of Cavalry Philipp Landgraf von Hessen-Darmstadt Dragoon Regiment (seven squadrons); General of Cavalry Maxmilian Wilhelm, Herzog von Braunschweig - Luneburg und Hannover Dragoon Regiment (seven squadrons); Gundacker Ludwig Josef Graf von Althann Dragoon Regiment (seven squadrons); General of Cavalry Georg Wilhelm Mark graf von Brandenburg-Bayreuth Hussar Regiment (seven squadrons)
Cavalry Brigade Major General Carl Graf von Eckh	General of Cavalry Florentin Clemens Graf von Mercy Cuirassier Regiment (seven squadrons); General of Cavalry Carl de Martigny Cuirassier Regiment (seven squadrons)
Cavalry Brigade Josef August Furst von Lobkowitz	Ludwig Ferdinand von Graven Dragoon Regiment (seven squadrons); Freiherr von Falkenstein Cuirassier Regiment (seven squadrons)

==== 2nd Line ====
Division	Regiments and Others
Infantry Division Carl Herzog von Braunschweig-Luneburg-Bevern	Joseph Innozenz Herzog von Lothringen und Bar (Alt) Infantry Regiment (two battalions); Anton Graf von Alcoudete Infantry Regiment (one battalion); Major General Francesco Cavaliere Marullo Infantry Regiment (one battalion); Philip Wilhelm Konrad van Hoensbroeck-Gehlen Infantry Regiment (two battalions); Wilrich Philip Lorenz Count von Daun (Jung) Infantry Regiment (two battalions); Ernst Philipp van der Lanckhen Infantry Regiment (two battalions); Carl Herzog von Braunschweig-Luneburg-Bevern Infantry Regiment (two battalions)
Infantry Division General of Infantry Johann Josef Philipp Graf von Harrach Rohrau	General of Infantry Johann Josef Philipp Graf von Harrach Rahrau Infantry Regiment (three battalions); Don Juan Conde di Ahumada y Cardenas Infantry Regiment (one battalion); Claudius Alexander Comte de Bonneval Infantry Regiment (one battalion); Friedrich Herzog von Wurttemberg Infantry Regiment (two battalions); Major General Franz Paul Graf von Wallis Infantry Regiment (two battalions); Major General Emerich Friedrich de Fabre Infantry Regiment (one battalion); Johann Leopold Donat Furst von Trautson Infantry Regiment (two battalions); Emmanuel Prinz d'Elboeuf von Lothringen (Jung) Infantry Regiment (two battalions)
Cavalry Division MG Johann Peter von Saint-Amour	General of Cavalry Franz Anselm Graf von Schonbron (seven squadrons); Major General Johann Peter von Saint Amour (seven squadrons); Josef Ulbricht Graf Croix Cuirassier Regiment (seven squadrons); Johann Heinrich Graf Hautois de Bronne Cuirassier Regiment (seven squadrons)
Cavalry Division General of Cavalry Franz Graf Jörger von Tollet	Peter Josef de Viard Dragoon Regiment (seven squadrons); Georg Christoph Furst von Lubkowitz Cuirassier Regiment (seven squadrons); General of Cavalry Franz Graf Jorgen von Tollet Dragoon Regiment (seven squadrons); Emmanuel Comte de Galbes de Silva et Mendoza Dragoon Regiment (five squadrons)
Cavalry Brigade	Adam Comte de Gondrecourt Dragoon Regiment (seven squadrons); Cordova Cuirassier Regiment (five squadrons)
Cavalry Brigade Adam Comte de Gondrecourt	Vasquez Cuirassier Regiment (five squadrons); Eugene Moritz Prinz zu Savoyen-Carignac Cuirassier Regiment (seven squadrons)

==== 3rd Line ====
Division	Regiments and Others
3rd Line	General of Infantry Georg Wilhelm von Loffelholz-Colberg Regiment (three battalions)

==== Skirmishers ====
Division	Regiments and Others
Hussar Division	General of Cavalry Ladislaus Freiherr von Ebergenyi Hussar Regiment (five squadrons); Major General Johann Ladislaus Freiherr von Splenyi de Mihaldy Hussar Regiment (seven squadrons); Colonel Jozef Graf Esterhazy de Galantha Hussar Regiment (five squadrons); Paul Freiherr von Babocsay Hussar Regiment (five squadrons); General of Cavalry Ferencz Graf Nadasdy Hussar Regiment (five squadrons)

=== Ottoman army ===
Silahdar Damat Ali Pasha (killed)

Division	Regiments and Others
Auxiliary (Vassal) light cavalry	Tartar (Khan of the Crimea) (2,000 men); Irregulars (8,000 men)
Provincial/Frontier Cavalry	Gonullu (non-combat) (2,000 men); Deli (3,000 men)
Infantry (Provincial) Sari Ahmed Pacha	Tuefekschi Musketeers (10,000 men); Gonullu (non-combat) (5,000 men); Yoynuk (Vassal Christian) (5,000 men)
Provincial/Frontier Cavalry	Cebeli (2,000 men); Spahi (8,000 men)
Regular/slave Cavalry	Silahdaran (junior) cuirassier regiment (5,900 men); Gureba-i yesar regiment (foreign mercenaries) (2,000 men); Ulufeciyan-i yesar(n) regiment (1,500 men)
Infantry Sari Ahmed	Janissary Corps (32,600 men); Division Cemaat (40,400 men)
Support	Boluk division (12,600 men); Sekban "dragoon" division (6,700 men)
Artillery Corps	5,000 gunners; 1,600 gun-wagon drivers; 6,000 armorers/ammunition carriers; 400 sappers/miners; 300 bombardiers
Regular/slave cavalry Turk Ahmed Pasha	Gureba-i yemin regiment (1,500 foreign mercenaries); Ulufeciyan-i yemin regiment (2,000 men); Sipahiyan "bodyguard" regiment (7,800 men); Muteferrika Imperial Guard cavalry regiment (500 men)

== Sources ==
- Higgins, David R. "Peterwardein: Eugene Turns the Tide in Hungary 5 August 1716." in Strategy & Tactics, Number 248 (March/April 2008)
