= Battle of Junín order of battle =

The order of battle proceeded as follows:

== See also ==
- Peruvian War of Independence
