= Battle of Lesnaya order of battle =

The following units fought in the Battle of Lesnaya on October 9, 1708 during the Great Northern War.

== Russian army ==
Tsar Peter I of Russia.

=== Corps Volant, infantry ===
- Preobrazhenski Guards (1,556)
- Semenovski Guards (1,664)
- Ingermanlandski Regiment (1,610)
- Astrakhanski Regiment (319)
- Total: 5,149

=== Corps Volant, dragoons ===
- Menshikovs's Squadron/Life regiment (604)
- Nevski Regiment (786)
- Vladimirski Regiment (914)
- Tverski Regiment (779)
- Sibirski Regiment (702)
- Rostovski Regiment (767)
- Nizhegorodski Regiment (753)
- Troitski Regiment (839)
- Smolenski Regiment (888)
- Viatski Regiment (769)
- Total: 7,801

=== Bauer's dragoons ===
- Kievski Regiment (612)
- Novgorodski Regiment (930)
- Permski Regiment (678)
- Narvski Regiment (385)
- Yamburgski Regiment (546)
- Kargopolski Regiment (582)
- Ustiugski Regiment (655)
- Koporski Regiment (588)
- Total: 4,976

Grand total: 17,926 men (excluding officers, artillery personal and irregulars)
NOTES:

- Including officers (about 10% of the actual force), Cossack and Kalmyks (2,500–5,000) and artillery personnel (at least five men on each cannon [150 men]) the force would 'estimated' reach over 22,000 men.
- Another 8,000 men under general Werden, marched from the village of Patskovo to join the battle. However, they did not make it to participate in the fighting.
- About 900 men from Bauer's dragoons did not participate in the main battle, as they instead were positioned at Propoisk to block the Swedish escape route.
- In earlier Russian accounts, the regiments had been reduced with 100 men, in some cases more, for propaganda reasons. For example, Preobrazhenski Guards (1,456) and Semenovski Guards (1,564).

== Swedish army ==
Adam Ludwig Lewenhaupt, Governor of Riga.

=== Infantry ===
- Hälsinge Regiment (1,160)
- Björneborg Regiment (900)
- Upplands, Västmanlands and Dalarnas tremänningsregemente (980)
- Åbo, Björneborgs and Nylands tremänningsregemente (900)
- Smålands tremänningsregemente (600)
- Livland and Ösels infanteriregemente (880)
- Åboland Regiment (500)
- Nyland Regiment (500)
- Österbotten Regiment (600)
- Närke-Värmlands tremänningsregemente (400)
- Öselska infanteribataljonen (580)
- Artillery Regiment (50)
- Total: 8,050

=== Cavalry ===
- Livländska Adelsfanan (200)
- Åbo and Björneborg Regiment (1,000)
- Karelska Regiment (800)
- Upplands Ståndsdragoner (800)
- Schlippenbachs livländska värvade dragonregemente (600)
- Schreiterfelts livländska värvade dragonregemente (600)
- Karelska lantdragonskvadronen (300)
- Skoghs livländska dragonskvadron (300)
- Öselska ståndsdragonskvadronen (300)
- Vallack cavalry (50)
- Total: 4,950

Grand total: 13,000 men (excluding officers)
NOTES:

- The table above is from Petre's diary which is the highest (Swedish) estimation of the Swedish troops, Lewenhaupt claimed his force being 10,914 strong and Weihe claimed the Swedish force to 11,450.
- The Swedish army was 13,000 soldiers strong (excluding officers, 1,300 men) when they started their march from Riga. However, the long march caused about 10% casualties, having the total strength with officers 13,000.
- Only about 9,000 men participated in the actual battle having the others protecting the wagon train.
