= Battle of Globe Tavern order of battle: Union =

The following Union Army units and commanders fought in the Battle of Globe Tavern (August 18–21, 1864) of the American Civil War. Order of battle compiled from the casualty returns. The Confederate order of battle is listed separately.

== Abbreviations used ==
=== Military rank ===
- MG = Major General
- BG = Brigadier General
- Col = Colonel
- Ltc = Lieutenant Colonel
- Maj = Major
- Cpt = Captain
- Lt = Lieutenant

=== Other ===
- w = wounded
- mw = mortally wounded
- k = killed
- c = captured

== Army of the Potomac ==
=== V Corps ===
MG Gouverneur K. Warren, Senior Commander on the field

Escort: Lt John C. Paul

- 4th Pennsylvania Cavalry (detachment)

Provost Guard: Maj Henry W. Rider

- 5th New York (battalion)

Ambulance Train: Cpt William F. Drum

Division	Brigade	Regiments and Others
First Division; BG Charles Griffin	1st Brigade Col William S. Tilton	121st Pennsylvania: Cpt Nathaniel Lang; 142nd Pennsylvania: Ltc Horation N. Warren; 143rd Pennsylvania: Cpt Chester K. Hughes; 149th Pennsylvania: Ltc John Irvin; 150th Pennsylvania: Maj George W. Jones; 187th Pennsylvania: Cpt Joseph A. Ege
First Division; BG Charles Griffin	2nd Brigade Col Edgar M. Gregory	32nd Massachusetts; 21st Pennsylvania Cavalry (dismounted); 91st Pennsylvania; 155th Pennsylvania
First Division; BG Charles Griffin	3rd Brigade Col James Gwyn; Ltc William A. Throop	20th Maine: Cpt Joseph F. Land; 18th Massachusetts: Cpt Luther S. Bent; 1st Michigan: Ltc William A. Throop, Maj George C. Hopper; 16th Michigan: Col Norval B. Welch; 44th New York: Ltc Freeman Conner; 83rd Pennsylvania: Ltc DeWitt C. McCoy; 118th Pennsylvania
Second Division; BG Romeyn B. Ayres	1st Brigade BG Joseph Hayes (c) Aug 19; Col Frederick Winthrop; Col Charles P. Stone	5th New York: Col Frederick Winthrop; 140th New York; 146th New York: Maj James G. Grindlay; 10th United States (3 companies): Cpt Robert H. Hall; 11th United States: Cpt Joshua S. Fletcher, Jr.; 12th United States: Cpt Samuel S. Newbury (k); 14th United States: Cpt Charles H. Ingrahm (sick), Lt Alfred Foote (w), Lt John C. White (c); 17th United States
Second Division; BG Romeyn B. Ayres	2nd Brigade Col Nathan T. Dushane (k) Aug 21; Col Samuel A. Graham	1st Maryland: Ltc John W. Wilson; 4th Maryland; 7th Maryland; 8th Maryland; Purnell (Maryland) Legion: Col Samuel A. Graham
Second Division; BG Romeyn B. Ayres	3rd Brigade	15th New York Heavy Artillery: Ltc Michael Wiedrich (w), Maj Louis Eiche
Third Division; BG Samuel W. Crawford	1st Brigade Col Peter Lyle	16th Maine: Col Charles W. Tilden; 39th Massachusetts: Ltc Charles L. Peirson (w); 104th New York: Col Gilbert G. Prey (c), Ltc John R. Strang (c); 90th Pennsylvania: Ltc William A. Leech (c), Maj Jacob M. Davis (c), Cpt William P. Davis; 107th Pennsylvania: Col Thomas F. McCoy
Third Division; BG Samuel W. Crawford	2nd Brigade Col Richard Coulter; Col Charles Wheelock	94th New York: Maj John McMahon; 97th New York: Col Charles Wheelock, Cpt Delos E. Hall; 11th Pennsylvania: Cpt Benjamin F. Haines; 88th Pennsylvania: Cpt Henry Whiteside
Third Division; BG Samuel W. Crawford	3rd Brigade Col William R. Hartshorne (c August 19th)	190th Pennsylvania: Ltc Joseph Pattee; 191st Pennsylvania: Col James Carle
Fourth Division; BG Lysander Cutler (w) Aug 21	1st Brigade BG Edward S. Bragg	7th Indiana: Maj Merit C. Welsh; 19th Indiana; 24th Michigan: Ltc Albert M. Edwards; 1st Battalion New York Sharpshooters: Cpt Clinton Perry (c); 6th Wisconsin: Cpt Charles P. Hyatt (w), Cpt William M. Remington; 7th Wisconsin: Ltc Mark Finnicum
Fourth Division; BG Lysander Cutler (w) Aug 21	2nd Brigade Col William Hofmann	3rd Delaware: Cpt James E. Bailey; 4th Delaware: Ltc Charles E. LaMotte; 76th New York: Ltc John E. Cook; 95th New York: Maj Robert W. Bard (w); 147th New York: Ltc George Harney; 56th Pennsylvania: Maj John T. Jack; 157th Pennsylvania (battalion): Cpt Thomas E. Carter
Fourth Division; BG Lysander Cutler (w) Aug 21	Provost Guard	Independent (Wisconsin) Battalion
	Artillery Brigade Col Charles S. Wainwright	Massachusetts Light, 3rd Battery (C): Cpt Augustus P. Martin, Lt Aaron F. Walcott; Massachusetts Light, 5th Battery (E); Massachusetts Light, 9th Battery; 1st New York Light, Battery B: Lt Robert E. Rogers; 1st New York Light, Battery C; 1st New York Light, Battery D: Cpt Angell Matthewson; 1st New York Light, Battery E & Battery L; 1st New York Light, Battery H; New York Light, 5th Battery; New York Light, 15th Battery: Cpt Patrick Hart; 1st Pennsylvania Light, Battery B; 4th United States, Battery B; 5th United States, Battery D: Lt William E. Van Reed

=== IX Corps ===
MG John Parke

Division	Brigade	Regiments and Others
First Division; BG Julius White	1st Brigade Ltc Joseph H. Barnes	21st Massachusetts (3 companies); 29th Massachusetts; 35th Massachusetts; 56th Massachusetts; 57th Massachusetts; 59th Massachusetts; 100th Pennsylvania
First Division; BG Julius White	2nd Brigade Ltc Gilbert P. Robinson	3rd Maryland; 14th New York Heavy Artillery; 179th New York; 2nd Pennsylvania Provisional Heavy Artillery: Cpt James W. Haig
First Division; BG Julius White	Artillery	Massachusetts Light, 14th Battery
Second Division; BG Robert B. Potter	1st Brigade Col Zenas R. Bliss; Col John I. Curtin	36th Massachusetts; 58th Massachusetts; 2nd New York Mounted Rifles (dismounted); 51st New York; 45th Pennsylvania: Col John I. Curtin; 48th Pennsylvania: Maj Oliver Bosbyshell; 4th Rhode Island
Second Division; BG Robert B. Potter	2nd Brigade BG Simon G. Griffin	31st Maine; 32nd Maine; 2nd Maryland; 6th New Hampshire; 9th New Hampshire; 11th New Hampshire; 17th Vermont
Second Division; BG Robert B. Potter	Acting Engineers	7th Rhode Island Infantry: Ltc Percy Daniels
Second Division; BG Robert B. Potter	Artillery	Massachusetts Light, 11th Battery; New York Light, 19th Battery
Third Division; BG Orlando B. Willcox	1st Brigade BG John F. Hartranft	8th Michigan: Maj Horatio Belcher (k); 27th Michigan; 109th New York; 13th Ohio Cavalry (dismounted); 51st Pennsylvania; 37th Wisconsin; 38th Wisconsin (5 companies)
Third Division; BG Orlando B. Willcox	2nd Brigade Col William Humphrey	1st Michigan Sharpshooters: Col Charles V. DeLand; 2nd Michigan; 20th Michigan; 24th New York Cavalry (dismounted); 46th New York; 60th Ohio; 50th Pennsylvania
Third Division; BG Orlando B. Willcox	Acting Engineers	17th Michigan Infantry: Cpt Joseph A. Sudsborough

=== Cavalry ===
Division	Brigade	Regiments and Others
Second Division, Cavalry Corps, Army of the Potomac	1st Brigade Col William Stedman	1st Massachusetts; 1st New Jersey; 10th New York; 6th Ohio; 1st Pennsylvania
Cavalry Division, Army of the James	2nd Brigade Col Samuel P. Spear	1st District of Columbia; 11th Pennsylvania
