= Battle of Globe Tavern order of battle =

The order of battle for the Battle of Globe Tavern, also known as the Second Battle of the Weldon Railroad, includes:

- Battle of Globe Tavern order of battle: Confederate
- Battle of Globe Tavern order of battle: Union

== See also ==
- Battle of the Weldon Railroad (disambiguation)
