= Battle of Trevilian Station order of battle =

The order of battle for the Battle of Trevilian Station includes:

- Battle of Trevilian Station order of battle: Confederate
- Battle of Trevilian Station order of battle: Union
