= James Gwyn =

Union Army officer during the American Civil War

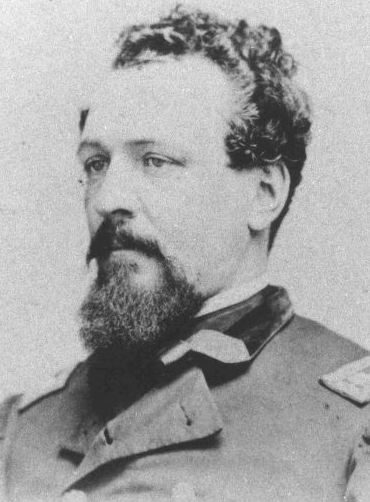
- Born: November 24, 1828; Derry, Ireland
- Died: July 17, 1906 (aged 77); Yonkers, New York
- Burial place: The Woodlands, Philadelphia, Pennsylvania
- Spouse: Margaretta E. Gwyn
- Military career
- Allegiance: United States of America; Union
- Branch: United States Army; Union Army
- Service years: April 21, 1861 – June 5, 1865
- Rank: Colonel; Brevet Brigadier General; Brevet Major General
- Commands: 118th Pennsylvania Regiment; 3rd Brigade, Second Division, V Corps, Army of the Shenandoah
- Conflicts: American Civil War; Battle of Seven Pines; Battle of Antietam; Battle of Shepherdstown; Battle of Fredericksburg; Battle of Gettysburg; Battle of the Wilderness; Battle of Globe Tavern; Battle of Peebles's Farm; Battle of Appomattox Court House

Signature
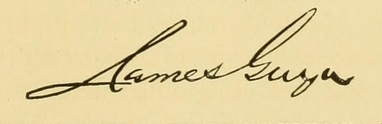

James Gwyn (November 24, 1828 – July 17, 1906) was an officer in the Union Army during the American Civil War. He immigrated at a young age from Ireland in 1846, initially working as a storekeeper in Philadelphia and later as a clerk in New York City. At the onset of the war, in 1861, he enlisted and was commissioned as a captain with the 23rd Pennsylvania Volunteer Infantry. He assumed command of the 118th Pennsylvania Regiment in the course of the war. Gwyn led that regiment through many of its 39 recorded battles, including engagements at Seven Pines, Fredericksburg, Shepherdstown, Five Forks, Gettysburg, and Appomattox Court House.

Gwyn was wounded at the Battle of the Wilderness in 1864, but returned to service after recuperating to take command of the Third, and eventually the First and Second Brigades of the First Division of the Union Army's V Corps. Gwyn was brevetted as a brigadier general by President Abraham Lincoln and then as a major general by President Andrew Johnson for his service. His men described him as "a handsome and accomplished officer, and a bold and aggressive leader". After the war, Gwyn returned to Philadelphia, although later moving to New York, and resumed his business dealings. He died on July 17, 1906, and was honored with a military funeral and buried in Woodlands Cemetery, Philadelphia.

== Early life ==
Gwyn was born in Derry, Ireland on November 24, 1828. He was one of ten children raised in the Protestant household of Alexander Gwyn and Catherine Garvin. His brother, Hugh Garvin Gwyn, would later serve in the Confederate States Army as a major with the 23rd Tennessee Infantry Regiment, as well as an adjutant to General John Hunt Morgan.

He lived in the rural Irish city until he enrolled in Foyle College. Like many Irish in the 1840s, Gwyn left Ireland for the United States during the Great Famine. He boarded the John R. Skiddy, a packet ship from Liverpool, bound for New York City. On November 4, 1846, Gwyn arrived in America via the Port of New York, 22 days before his 18th birthday, although his immigration papers list him as 20.

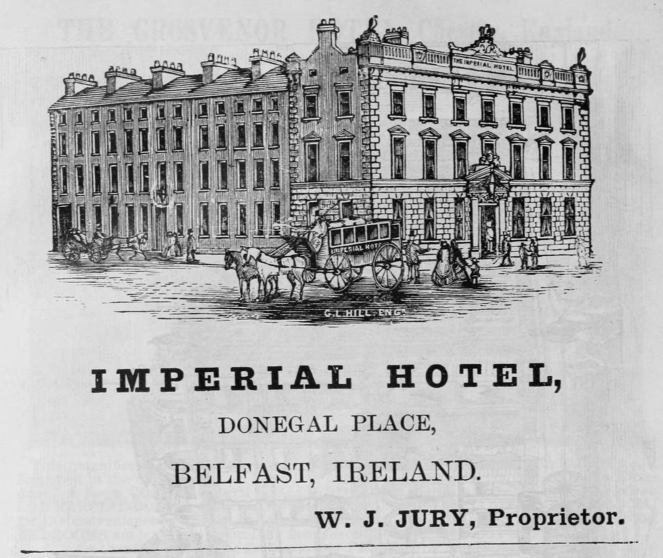
Imperial Hotel Belfast, 1885

Upon arriving in the United States, Gwyn and many other Derry immigrants made their way to Philadelphia as was noted by an Emigration Officer Edward Smith at Derry that, "Nevertheless, the money that recent arrivals in America remitted for the passage of others was central to the whole link between Derry and Philadelphia".

On August 30, 1850, Gwyn took up residence in the North Mulberry Ward where he owned a house. He married Pennsylvania native Margaretta E. Young in February. Although he worked as a clerk throughout the 1850s, he later formed a dried goods business with George H. Stewart, called "Gwyn & Stewart Dry Goods".

Gwyn purchased a 141 square feet (13 m^{2}) plot in the Woodlands Cemetery on October 12, 1853. Records show that on April 28, 1857 'James Gwyn & Lady' from Philadelphia visited the Imperial Hotel Belfast until at least July 2. Gwyn's wife gave birth to his first child, Elizabeth Gailey Gwyn, on December 7, 1858, and their second daughter, Matilda Geddes, on January 2, 1861.

== Military service ==
=== Enlistment with the 23rd Pennsylvania Volunteer Infantry ===
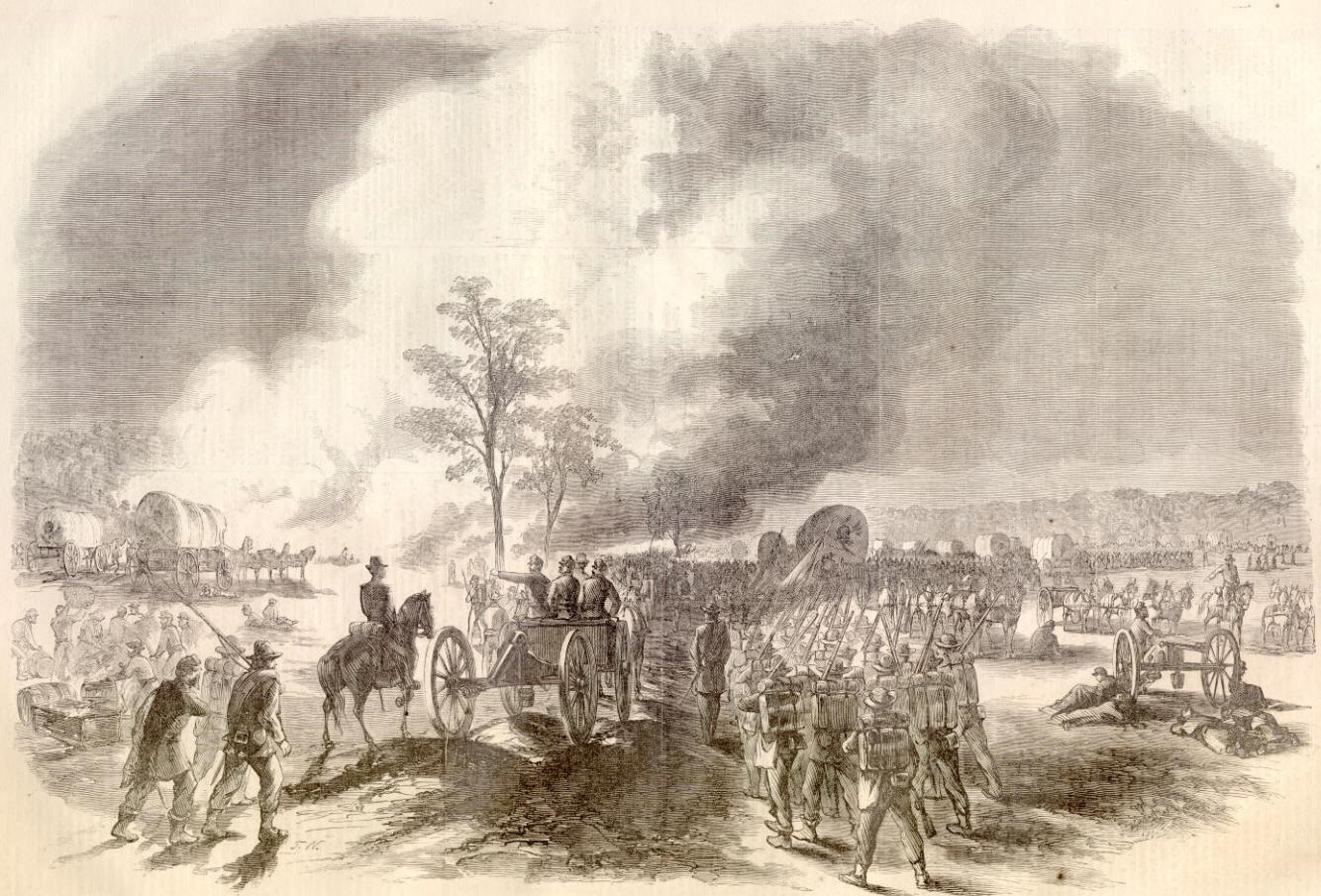
Depiction of the Battle of Seven Pines, Harper's Magazine, 16 August 1862 issue

Gwyn enlisted in Company G of the 23rd Pennsylvania Volunteer Infantry on April 21, 1861, one week after the American Civil War began. He served in that company without interruption until July 31, 1861, when he transferred to Company F. He resumed duty with the new company on August 2, 1861. Gwyn served with the 23rd Volunteers for over one year; in that time, he took part in the Battle of Seven Pines, where, on May 31, 1862, Gwyn led the 23rd in aiding other Union companies in collecting escaped fugitives. Gwyn resigned from the 23rd Volunteers on July 22, 1862, where he accepted a promotion to lieutenant colonel in a new regiment.

=== Lieutenant colonel, 118th Pennsylvania Infantry ===
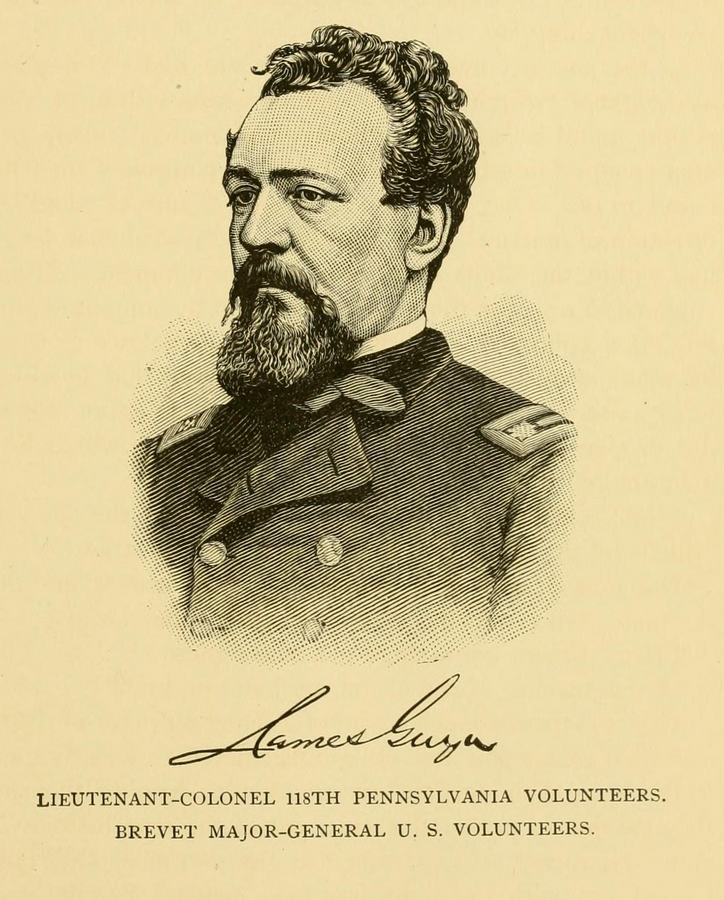
Illustration of James Gwyn in the History of the Corn Exchange Regiment

Gywn joined the 118th Pennsylvania Infantry, on July 25, 1862. The 118th, which was commissioned by the United States Department of War for three years of service, gathered recruits from the Philadelphia area during August 15 to 30,1862. Gwyn was officially mustered into service on August 16, 1862. During this time, the 118th became known as the "Corn Regiment", because the funds for raising the regiment were furnished by the Corn Exchange Association of Philadelphia. Having gathered 1,296 volunteers during the two-week period, the "Corn Regiment" left for Washington, D.C., to be assigned a position in the Union Army on September 1, 1862. The regiment was embedded with the First Brigade, First Division, Fifth Army Corps under the regiment command of Colonel Charles Prevost, and brigade commander Colonel James Barnes.

The 118th Regiment moved out with the rest of the Fifth Army Corps marching towards Maryland. Upon reaching Maryland, the 118th along with the rest of the Fifth Army Corps, became involved in the Battle of Antietam. While that battle would become to be known as "the bloodiest day in American history" with over 22,000 casualties, the 118th was not involved on the front lines. They instead assisted in artillery stocking.

The 118th Regiment returned to battle three days afterwards, taking part in the Battle of Shepherdstown. The regiment took heavy casualties during the battle, suffering 71 deaths, 75 wounded, and 67 captured. The Confederates also suffered heavy losses with approximately 262 casualties in the battle. Among the Union wounded was Prevost, colonel of the 118th Regiment, who was shot through the shoulder on the last day of the battle. Prevost resigned from active duty, and Gwyn, as second-in-command, took over the regiment as acting commander. Gwyn's "courage and coolness" during that battle were praised by Colonel Barnes, the brigade commander, in a letter written five days after the battle ended.

On September 28, 1862, Gwyn sent a letter to Colonel Barnes stating that the 118th Regiment did not provide the Philadelphia Inquirer with information that the paper used to publish a map and a report of the incident. Two days later, Gwyn issued a report on the Battle of Shepherdstown, noting the efforts he made to rally troops to fight back against the Confederate troops, though his efforts were in vain, as Colonel Barnes ordered to regiment to fall back.

The 118th Regiment returned to the front lines on December 11, 1862, in the Battle of Fredericksburg. Barnes formed the First Brigade, First Division from the 118th Pennsylvania (Gwyn), 22nd Massachusetts, 25th New York, 13th New York, 1st Michigan, and 2nd Maine Regiments. In a recorded incident during the battle, a house was discovered with hidden tobacco crates which the soldiers raided. Gwyn sharply criticized the men for breaking rank but "inwardly smiled at their enthusiasm".

Following the unsuccessful Mud March of January 1863, the regiment went into 'winter quarters' until June. The Fifth Army Corps resumed activity on June 10, 1863, as it began to travel northward through enemy territory, with skirmishes frequently occurring. These travels ultimately led the Fifth Army Corps to Pennsylvania, where, on July 2, 1863, they arrived to aid the Union Army during the Battle of Gettysburg. Gwyn, still as acting commander of the regiment, was given the orders to position the 118th Regiment on Cemetery Hill and to hold the position. In the afternoon, the regiment was ordered to assist Major General Daniel Sickles on the left flank that same day. On July 3, the second day of the battle, Gwyn led the 118th to Little Round Top where they held their position for two days until Union forces had achieved albeit a costly victory. Following Gettysburg, the 118th Regiment moved around the state to various positions. On August 6, the regiment stationed at Warrenton, Virginia, received 109 new recruits, and on September 5, another 185. On September 30, 1863, Prevost officially retired, and Gwyn was promoted to colonel and the commanding officer of the 118th. During this time, Prevost had been stationed as commandant of a military prison in Elmira, New York.

=== Colonel, 118th Pennsylvania Regiment ===
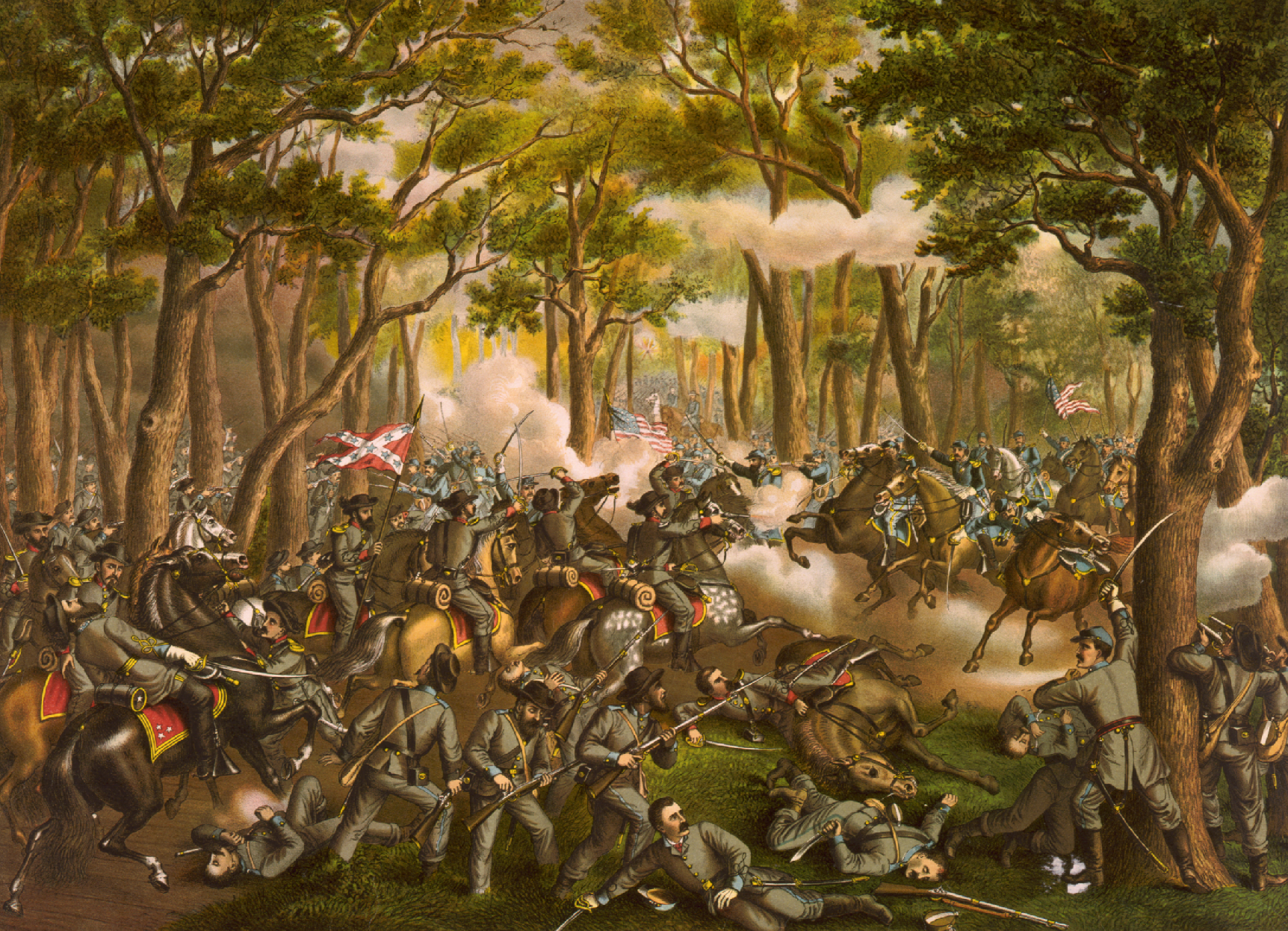
Depiction of the Battle of the Wilderness by Kurz & Allison where Gwyn was seriously wounded in the thigh.

During the autumn of 1863 and through the winter, the regiment engaged in "desultory fighting". Gwyn served perfunctorily while in command of the 118th Regiment for the ensuing five months with no notable confrontations until the Battle of the Wilderness in May 1864. On the first day of battle, May 5, Gwyn was shot in the thigh, and put out of commission for at least one month. Gwyn would receive his promotion to colonel at Beverly Ford for his actions at Wilderness. Due to his injury, he was unable to lead the 118th Regiment into the multiple conflicts, including the Battle of Spotsylvania Court House, the Battle of North Anna, the Battle of Totopotomoy Creek, the Battle of Bethesda Church, and the Battle of Cold Harbor.

Gwyn, having returned to active duty by this time, led the 118th in the Siege of Petersburg and Richmond campaign that lasted from June 9, 1864, to March 25, 1865. The exact date and orders where Gwyn received his commission as commander of the Third Brigade is unknown, although subsequent documents show Gwyn reporting to headquarters as the brigade commander.

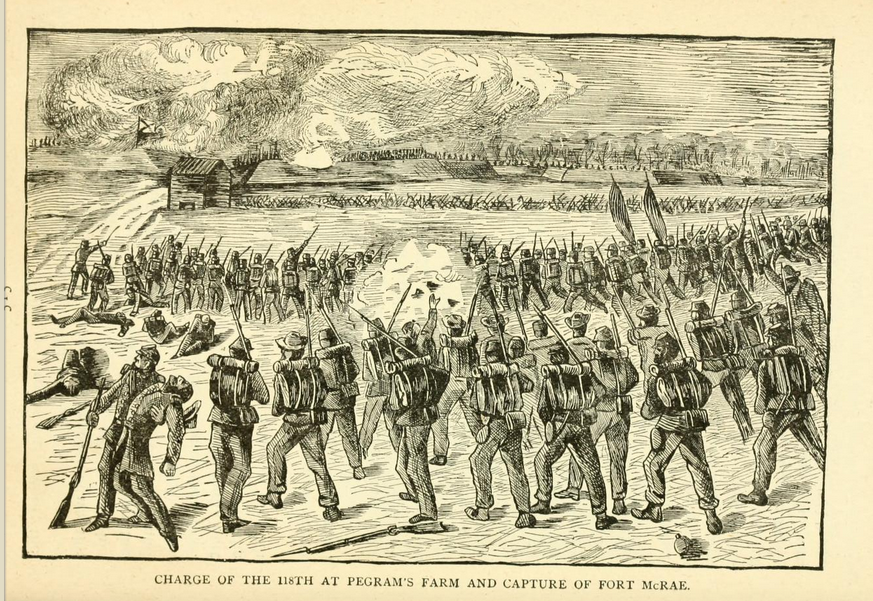
Illustration of the 118th Regiment in the charge for Fort McRae and capture of Pegram's Farm.

On August 18, 1864, Gwyn led the Third Brigade to the Weldon Railroad, where he met with the First and Second Brigade. The First Brigade was ordered to New York City, and by Special Order No. 32, he was ordered to also take command of Second Brigade and in the absence of Col. A. H. Grimshaw. The next day, the combined Union troops moved forward along the railroad until they joined the Second Division, led by General Romeyn Ayres. The Third Brigade remained at that station for the next eight days without incidence, with Gwyn submitting a report to the Headquarters of First Division concerning what transpired during those three days.

It was recorded in this time the regiment suffered heavy losses and according to Frank H. Taylor, "Grant was remorselessly wearing out the besieged enemy. Regiments were used unsparingly, and the "118th" was accorded its full share of the work." In particular, on the morning September 30, 1864 in the Battle of Pegram's Farm, and later the Battle of Peebles's Farm, to capture Fort McRae, 118th along with 16th Michigan were in direct line of four artillery guns from a church and fired upon with "special severity". At a two road junction in the afternoon, near Fort McRae, Gwyn's leg was severely wounded when his horse fell upon him, though, did not permanently cripple him or lead to amputation. Captain Wilson, the 118th second-in-command assumed command and pressed on with Ayres offensive that eventually led to a Union victory late in that evening.

=== Brevet Brigadier general, Third Brigade and 118th Pennsylvania Regiment ===
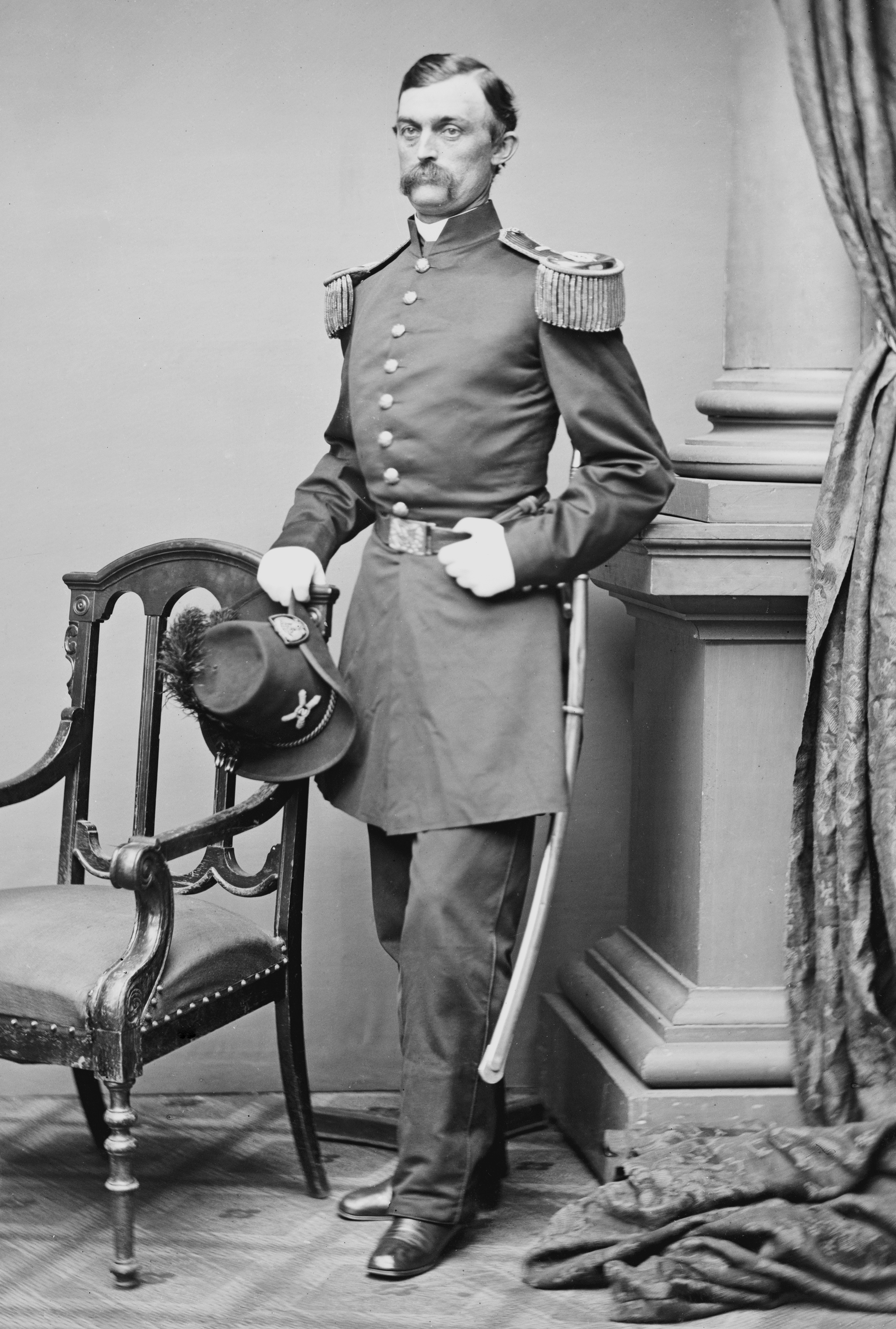
Charles Griffin who recommended Gwyn for promotion to brevet brigadier general

Gwyn's service during the Siege of Petersburg was noted by the commanding officer of the First Division, V Corps, General Charles Griffin as examples of Gwyn's "gallantry", "bravery" and "valor". Charles Griffin informed the Department of War that Gwyn should receive the rank of brigadier general, and if that was not possible then he should be brevetted the rank. The Federal Government approved of the idea and issued Special Order 347 on October 14, 1864, in which James Gwyn was awarded the grade of brevet brigadier general of volunteers, to rank from September 30, 1864, by President Abraham Lincoln. Gwyn was formally nominated by President Lincoln on December 12, 1864, and his appointment was confirmed by the U.S. Senate on February 14, 1865. The First Division received word of Gwyn's promotion on October 14, and passed down to Gywn on the 17th. In a letter, Griffin wrote that Gwyn's promotion was "evidence that the gallantry of our little command has been appreciated".

Gwyn continued his military duties with service around the James River near City Point, Virginia. Feeling ill, he returned to Philadelphia on October 31, 1864. He was diagnosed with malaria fever and prescribed a seven-day break to rest and recover. His leave was approved on November 4, and he was permitted to recover for a week, resuming duty of November 7, 1864. At his return, Gwyn, by Special Orders No. 301 was assigned to the First Division, First Brigade under Brigadier General Griffin by Major General Fred T. Locke. On November 19, 1864, he was transferred from the First Division to the Second Division, which was under the command of General Romeyn Ayres.

Ayres ordered Gwyn to take command of the Third Brigade on November 21. Two days later, Gwyn was notified that General Ayres would be absent for three days and would be fulfilling his role as acting commander of the Second Division. On December 14, General Ayres sent a report praising Gwyn's 'prompt' and 'efficient' service during the Battle of Globe Tavern, August 18–21, 1864, to the Fifth Army Corps. Gwyn led the Third Brigade without problems until December 21, when he was informed that General Ayres would be on a leave of absence for the twenty days, and that he would lead the Second Division until Ayres' return.

Gwyn took control of the Second Division, but soon went on a leave of absence from January 8, 18 days into his 20-day service assignment, to January 21, 1865. On February 5, he led the Third Brigade into the Battle of Hatcher's Run. On February 6, the Confederates engaged the Union army at 1:30 pm. The Third Brigade engaged the Rebels and were eventually overwhelmed and were forced to retreat. The Assistant Adjutant, Major General Locke, ordered Gwyn to reform the Third Brigade and to take on stragglers from assorted Maryland regiments. The fighting continued into the next day; by February 8, the Union forces near Hatcher's Run had retreated. On February 14, Major General Ayres highlighted Gwyn's leadership during the Battle of Hatcher's Run by stating that Gwyn had "seconded me with zeal and energy". Three days later, Gwyn wrote his own letter with names of soldiers who he thought were deserving of merit for their exceptional service during the Battle of Hatcher's Run.

=== End of the Civil War ===
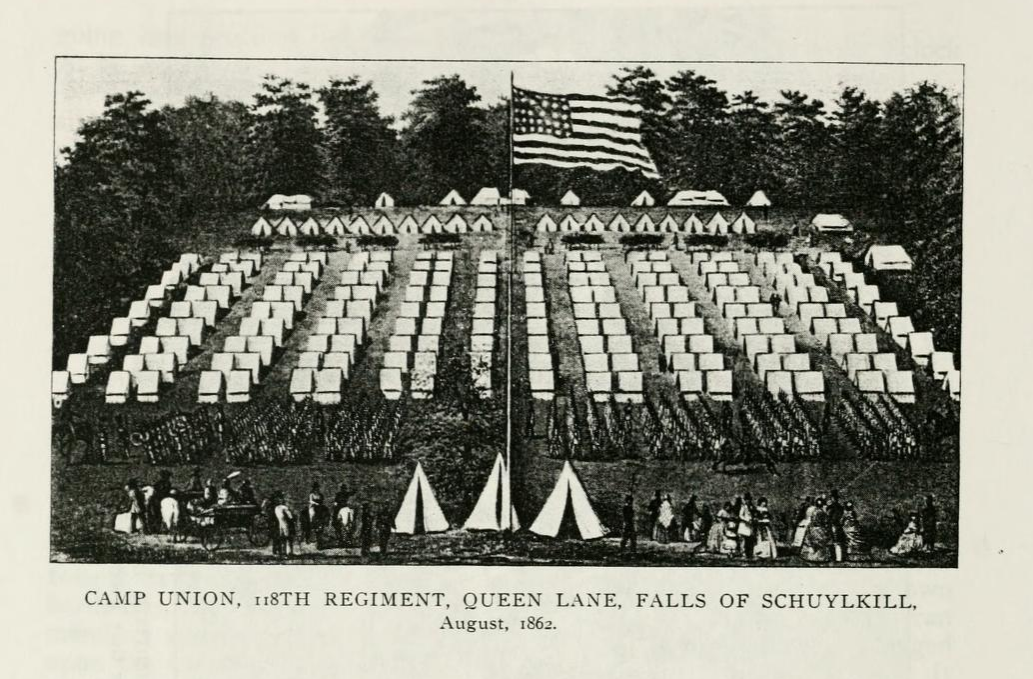
118th Regiment at Camp Union, August 1862

The Third Brigade fell back for over a month engaging in skirmishes around Hatcher's Run, Halifax road, and Rowanty Creek as part of the Richmond Campaign. Major operations resumed on March 31, 1865, when Gwyn led the Third Brigade in the Battle of White Oak Road, and eventually on to Five Forks, Dinwiddie County, Virginia. The Third Brigade took part in the Battle of Five Forks on April 1, 1865.

A charge led by Gwyn resulted in the capture of two strategic positions and a large number prisoners. Gwyn was later appointed brevet major general for his efforts during the battle. On January 13, 1869, President Andrew Johnson nominated Gwyn for appointment to the grade of brevet major general of volunteers, to rank from April 1, 1865, and the U.S. Senate confirmed the appointment on February 16, 1869.

Gwyn and the 118th pushed onwards, pressing the retreating Confederate troops during the Battle of Appomattox Court House, one of the last major battles of the Civil War. At the Appomattox Court House, on April 9, 1865, Robert E. Lee surrendered to Ulysses S. Grant, thus ending the Civil War. The 118th was present to witness the surrender and escorted the Confederate soldier that carried the truce flag. With the hostilities subsided, Gwyn filed a report concerning the skirmish at White Oak Road on April 14, 1865. A few weeks later on April 27, 1865, Brevet Major General Ayres advocated that Gwyn receive a promotion on account of his "zeal and good conduct" from March 29 to April 9 of that year.

Gwyn led the Third Brigade to Washington, D.C., for the Grand Review of the Armies, which took place on May 23 and 24, 1865. They arrived in Washington early by May 21 to attend roll-call with the rest of the Fifth Army Corps. According to the New York Times, Gwyn was listed at the Headquarters Army of the Potomac as "Third Brigade, Brevet Brig.-Gen. James Gwyn, commanding—190th Pennsylvania, Col. W.R. Hartshorne; 210th Pennsylvania, Major J.H. Graves; 4th Delaware, Brevet Lieut-Col. M.B. Gist; 3d Delaware, Capt. D.D. Joseph; 8th Delaware, Capt. John Richards; 191st Pennsylvania, Col. James Carle."

On June 5, 1865, the 118th Regiment was officially mustered out of service by the United States Department of War. On June 9, a large banquet was prepared in their honor by the Corn Exchange, the same bank that offered the initial payments for recruits to join years before, at Sansom Street Hall for the members of the former 118th Regiment, who had returned to Philadelphia. According to his obituary, Gwyn was offered a position as a lieutenant in the regular army by President Andrew Johnson, but instead chose to return to civilian life.

== Post Civil War ==
Following the conclusion of the Civil War, Gwyn resumed the life he had left behind in 1861. He returned home to his wife Margaret and daughters Elizabeth and Matilda, now five years older than the last time he saw them. He applied for his military pension on October 6, 1866. Though Gwyn served in positions with a difficulty as high as major general, because he was only brevet, the payment he received would be reduced to the level of his highest non-brevet rank; which would be colonel, the position he effectively gave up on October 14, 1864.

His wife gave birth to a third daughter, Margaret, on December 7, 1869. Gwyn and his family later moved from Philadelphia to a home in New York City. Gwyn had become connected with the mercantile house, Stuart Bros and returned to that business. Later on he would take a new job as a clerk in New York. His daughter Margaret married Frank L. Rehn where they moved out of the Brooklyn area to No. 9 Grove Street Yonkers, New York. Gwyn's middle daughter Matilda married in 1891 to a stockbroker, Andrew S. Brownell. They also moved away from the Brooklyn area to Matilda's house in Yonkers.

== Death ==
Gwyn family Woodlands Cemetery record for Section E.

Gwyn died in the late evening of July 17, 1906, while visited his daughter, Mrs. Frank L. Rehn (Margaret), at her home in Yonkers, New York. News of his death was reported in The New York Times and The Washington Post as far away as Salt Lake City in the Deseret News. His body was taken back to Philadelphia, where he was interred in the Woodlands Cemetery following a military funeral on July 19, 1906. He was buried in the cemetery plot section E, Lot 33 that he bought over fifty years earlier.

== See also ==
- List of American Civil War Union brevet generals
- Pennsylvania in the American Civil War
