= Battle of Trevilian Station order of battle: Union =

The following units and commanders fought in the Battle of Trevilian Station of the American Civil War on the Union side. The Confederate order of battle is shown separately. Order of battle compiled from the corps organization during the battle and from the casualty returns.

== Abbreviations used ==
=== Military rank ===
- MG = Major General
- BG = Brigadier General
- Col = Colonel
- Ltc = Lieutenant Colonel
- Maj = Major
- Cpt = Captain
- Lt = Lieutenant

=== Other ===
- w = wounded
- mw = mortally wounded
- c = captured

== Army of the Potomac ==
=== Cavalry Corps ===
MG Philip H. Sheridan

Escort:

- 6th United States: Cpt Ira W. Claflin

Division	Brigade	Regiments and Others
First Division; BG Alfred T. A. Torbert	1st Brigade BG George A. Custer	1st Michigan: Ltc Peter Stagg; 5th Michigan: Col Russell A. Alger; 6th Michigan: Maj James H. Kidd; 7th Michigan: Ltc Melvin Brewer (w), Maj Alexander Walker
First Division; BG Alfred T. A. Torbert	2nd Brigade Col Thomas Devin	4th New York: Col Luigi P. DiCessnola; 6th New York: Ltc William H. Crocker; 9th New York: Col William Sackett (mw), Ltc George S. Nichols; 17th Pennsylvania: Ltc James Q. Anderson
First Division; BG Alfred T. A. Torbert	Reserve Brigade (3rd Brigade) BG Wesley Merritt	1st United States: Cpt Nelson B. Sweitzer; 2nd United States: Cpt Theophilus F. Rodenbough (w), Cpt Charles McJ. Loeser (c), Cpt Daniel S. Gordon; 5th United States: Cpt William K. Arnold; 6th Pennsylvania: Cpt J. Hinckley Clark; 19th New York (1st Dragoons): Col Alfred Gibbs
Second Division; BG David McM. Gregg	1st Brigade BG Henry E. Davies, Jr.	1st Massachusetts: Ltc Samuel E. Chamberlain; 1st New Jersey: Ltc John W. Kester; 10th New York: Maj Mathew H. Avery; 6th Ohio: Col William Stedman; 1st Pennsylvania: Col John P. Taylor
Second Division; BG David McM. Gregg	2nd Brigade Col John Irvin Gregg	1st Maine: Col Charles H. Smith; 2nd Pennsylvania: Ltc Joseph P. Brinton; 4th Pennsylvania: Ltc George H. Covode; 8th Pennsylvania: Col Pennock Huey; 13th Pennsylvania: Maj Michael Kerwin; 16th Pennsylvania: Ltc John K. Robison
	Horse Artillery Brigade Cpt James M. Robertson	1st United States, Batteries H and I: Cpt Alanson M. Randol; 2nd United States, Batteries B and L: Lt Edward Heaton; 2nd United States, Battery D: Lt Edward B. Williston; 2nd United States, Battery M: Lt Alexander C. M. Pennington, Jr.
