= DeCosta =

DeCosta is a surname. Notable people with the surname include:

- Benjamin Franklin DeCosta (1831–1904), American clergyman and historical writer
- Eric DeCosta (born 1971), American football executive
- Karence DeCosta (1991–2009), American Virgin Islands singer and beauty queen
- Pam DeCosta (born 1964), American college basketball coach
