= 18th Massachusetts Infantry Regiment =

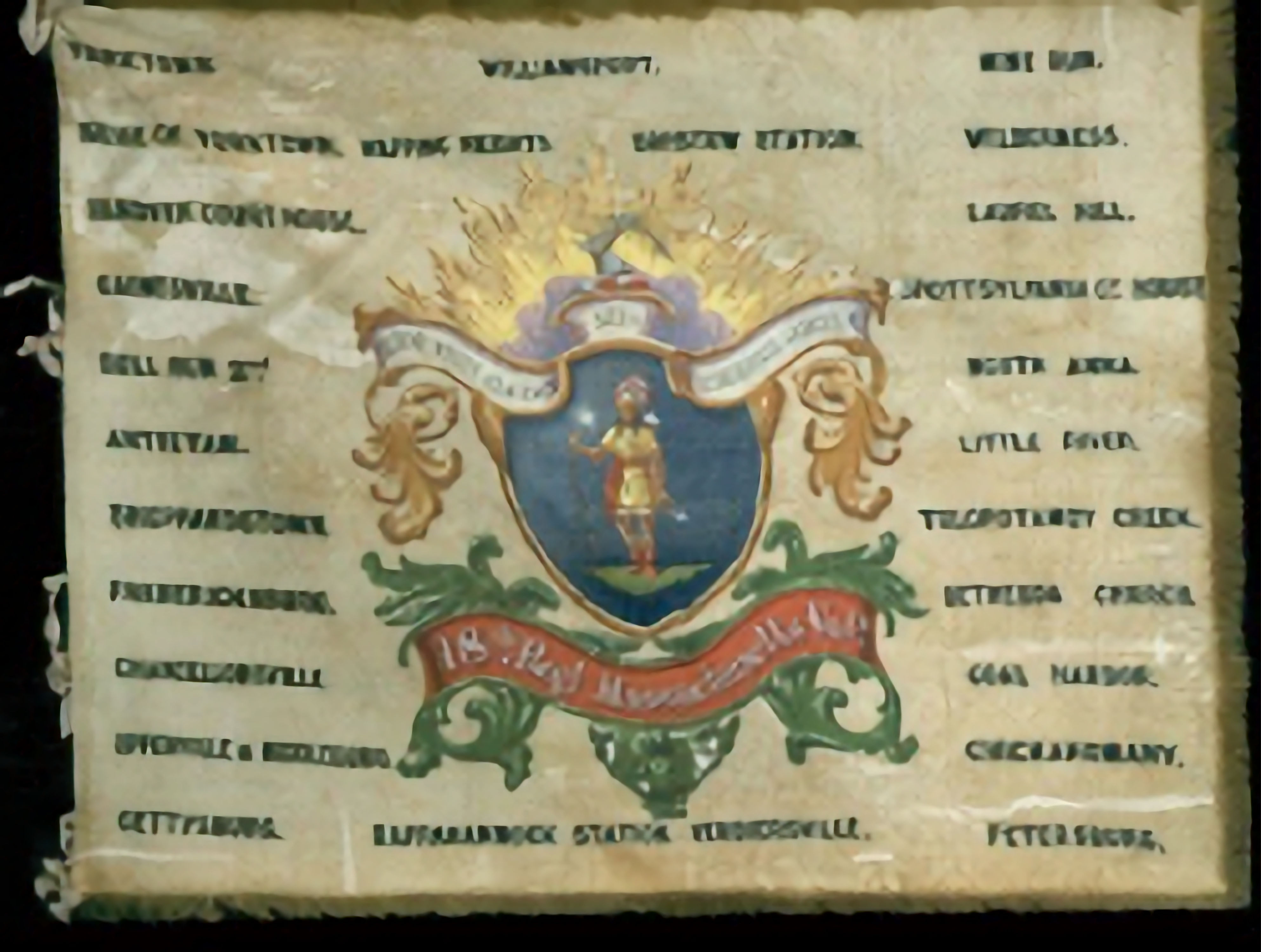
- Regimental colors of 18th Massachusetts Volunteers
- Active: August 1861 – September 1864
- Country: United States of America
- Allegiance: Union
- Branch: United States Army
- Type: Infantry
- Part of: In 1863: 1st Brigade (Tilton's), 1st Division (Barnes's), V Corps, Army of the Potomac
- Engagements: Siege of Yorktown; Battle of Hanover Court House; Second Battle of Bull Run; Battle of Antietam; Battle of Fredericksburg; Battle of Gettysburg; Battle of the Wilderness; Battle of Spotsylvania Court House; Battle of Cold Harbor; Siege of Petersburg

Commanders
- Notable commanders: Col. James Barnes

Insignia
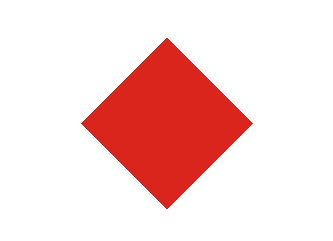
- 1st Division, III Corps

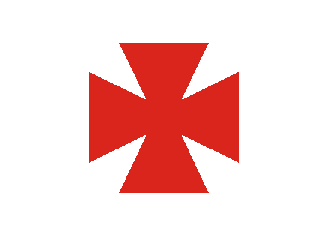
- 1st Division, V Corps

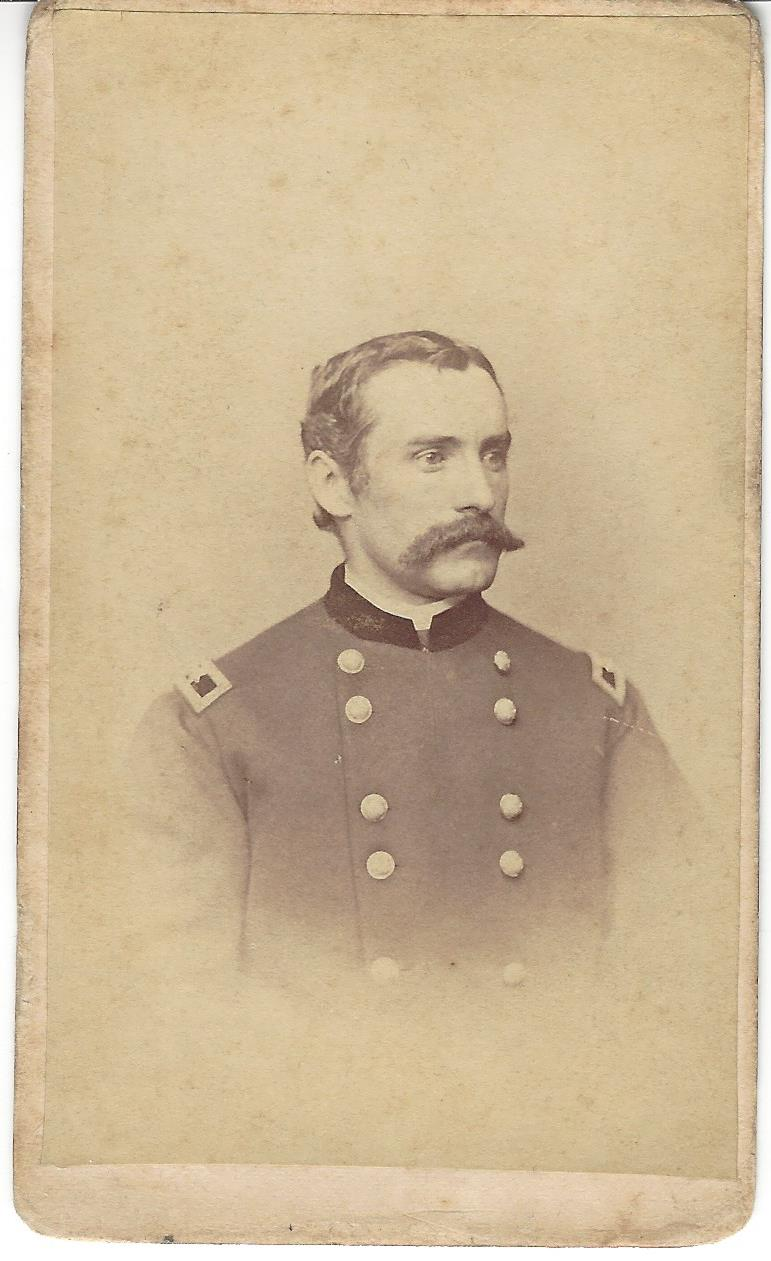
Joseph Hayes of the 18th Massachusetts Volunteer Infantry

The 18th Massachusetts Infantry Regiment was a Union regiment that fought in the American Civil War.

== History ==
=== Initial training ===
The regiment was organized at Readville and Boston in July 1861. Recruited chiefly from the counties of Norfolk, Bristol, and Plymouth, it then moved to at Camp Brigham (Note: Camp Brigham was specifically formed in Dedham to train the 18th Massachusetts.) in Dedham for basic training. It was formed, primarily, with men of the Bristol, Norfolk and Plymouth counties of Massachusetts with a 3-year enlistment period. The regiment originally consisted of 10 companies, band and regimental staff. The regiment followed the standard structure of the three-year volunteer regiments of ten companies of 83-101 men (which could be split into two battalions on an ad hoc basis) and a field staff of 36-66. (Note: Cavalry regiments were organized with twelve companies of 60-80 troopers. The extra two companies, or troops, led to a volunteer cavalry regiment being slightly smaller in total compared to an infantry regiment.) The officers were divided into field staff who ran the regiment and battalions and the line or company officers who ran the companies.

Due to a lack of personnel and infrastructure ready when the war began, the federal government left the recruiting, equipping, and providing of recruits to the states with reimbursement to come from the federal level upon muster into federal service. Since the states were handling the process, existing militia companies building to full-strength followed the existing militia practice of voting in new recruits which made recruitment slower than the new volunteer companies in the regiment. Five companies reached the rendezvous early in July, 1861, by direction of the governor when the defeat at Bull Run shook Washington, DC. In response, on 22 July, Lincoln authorized the call-up of 500,000 more three-year enlistments. The next day, the Secretary of War issued a call for all available regiments and detachments to be hurried forward at once.

Up to 20 August three more companies had formed. Most of the line officers were mustered on that day, and the enlisted men in camp were sworn in four days later. As a consequence, the regiment mustered into federal service on 27 August 1861 with only eight companies. Orders to report with the command at Washington were then received, and the journey began on the 28 August, with a full complement of officers, and eight hundred and ninety-one men. About a month later Company A joined the regiment, but Company C did not report for duty till the last of November, being sworn into the United states service 14 January 1862.

=== 1861 ===
Going by way of New York, Harrisburg, and Baltimore, the Eighteenth reached Washington 30 August, and next day reported to Colonel E.D. Baker, going into camp about a mile to the west of the Capitol, the location being called Camp Massachusetts. The regiment was ordered on the 3d of September to cross the river and report to General Fitz John Porter, commanding a division, by whom it was assigned to General Martindale's Brigade, its fellow regiments being the Second Maine, Thirteenth and Forty-first New York. The regimental camp was located near Fort Corcoran, on ground recently occupied by the Sixty-ninth New York, and the Eighteenth began to see actual service in fatigue duty and on picket. The division was moved to the front on the 26th and went into camp near Hall's Hill, then the outpost of the Union army. This position was occupied during the winter, the regiment giving much attention to drill and discipline, so that at a review held at Bailey's Cross Roads it was especially complimented for excellence by the commander in chief, and as a mark of appreciation received new uniform and camp equipage imported from France and modeled on that of the French chasseurs a pied. Before the opening of the spring campaign some changes were made in Martindale's Brigade, the Forty-first New York giving place to the Twenty-second Massachusetts and Twenty-fifth New York Regiments, while the Second Company of Massachusetts Sharpshooters was attached to the brigade, which was known as the First Brigade, Porter's Division, Third (Heintelman's) Corps.

=== 1862 ===
The winter camp was vacated 10 March 1862, and the regiment marched to Fairfax, stopping there until the 16th, when it was ordered to Alexandria to embark for the Peninsula. Transports were taken on the 21st, and two days later the command debarked at Old Point Comfort, encamping at Hampton for two days and then at Newmarket Bridge, where it remained until the Federal army was ready for the forward movement. This began on 4 April, and early on the afternoon of the following day the defenses of Yorktown were reached, before which the Army of the Potomac came to a halt and remained for a month. The Eighteenth took active part in the earlier operations by which the enemy's line was located, and three of its companies were at once placed on the skirmish line, while the remainder of the regiment formed a portion of the main line of battle, but no casualties were suffered. Later the command went into camp near by and daily furnished heavy details for outpost and fatigue duty until the evacuation of Yorktown. Immediately on that event Porter's Division took transports and landed on 8 May at West Point, near the junction of the Mattaponi and Pamunkey rivers. Up the south side of the latter the division marched, setting out on the 13th, going first to Cumberland, thence to White House, moving on the 19th toward Richmond as far as Tunstall's Station, and on the 26th to Gaines Mills.

During this time the Fifth (Provisional) Army Corps had been formed, of which General Porter was given command. It was composed of his own division, the command of which was taken by General Morrell, and another under General Sykes. The brigade to which the Eighteenth belonged was strengthened by the addition of the First Michigan Regiment, and was known as the First Brigade, First Division. About the same time the regiment exchanged the smooth-bore muskets with which it had thus far been armed for the Springfield rifled pattern. Early in the morning of the 27th the division set out for Hanover Court House, but as the Eighteenth had been on picket during a heavy storm it was not in condition to march at once; and though it followed a few hours later it was not in time to take part in the brilliant action by which General Porter defeated the Confederate force under General Branch. It assisted in burying the dead left upon the field by the enemy and on the 29th returned to its camp at Gaines Mills. There it remained until 26 June, when with the Seventeenth New York of Butterfield's Brigade it was detached from the division to accompany a force of cavalry and artillery under General Stoneman for the protection of the army supplies at White House. The operations which followed were arduous, and demanded many of the best qualities of soldiership, but all were performed in a manner to win praise. The stores there having been destroyed in conformity with McClellan's purpose to change base to the James river, the regiment embarked on transports, dropped down the river and finally by way of Fortress Monroe arrived at Harrison's Landing, where it debarked for one day before the arrival of the rest of the brigade, which meantime had been fighting its way across the Peninsula.

With the rest of the army, the Eighteenth encamped at Harrison's Landing until 15 August, the only movement of note during that time so far as they were concerned being a reconnaissance to the Chickahominy the last of July, returning to camp the same day. Before the transfer to the vicinity of Washington, however, various changes occurred among the officers. Colonel Barnes took command of the brigade, succeeding General Martindale, who was made military governor of Washington; Lieutenant Colonel Ingraham had been made colonel of a new Massachusetts regiment, then being recruited; Major Hayes having been prostrated by sickness was necessarily away from the regiment, and the command devolved upon Captain Thomas, under whom the march was made on the 15th to the Chickahominy, thence by way of Williamsburg, Yorktown, and Hampton to Newport News, where on the 20th transports were taken for Acquia Creek. Going from there by rail to Falmouth, the regiment marched to Rappahannock Station, where it arrived on the 23d. The next few days were devoted to maneuvering and marchings to and fro, falling back on the 27th to Warrenton, next day to Catlett's, and on the 29th to Manassas Gap. From this point it marched to the battle of Manassas, or the Second Bull Run, in which it was destined to take an important part.

As the brigade, temporarily under the command of Colonel Charles W. Roberts of the Second Maine, came upon the field during the forenoon of the 30th it was formed in double line of battle with supports in echelon, the Eighteenth forming the first line in rear of the skirmishers, two of its companies being deployed to extend the skirmish line so as to form connection on the right. An attempt was then made to advance across a field and through a piece of woods, by which it was hoped to flank a Confederate battery; but the failure of troops to the right and left to advance rendered the attempt futile; the brigade was soon obliged to half and answer the fire which was poured in from front and both flanks, and after half an hour of this unequal contest the decimated regiments fell back to a less exposed position, Syke's Division (Second) of the same corps covering their withdrawal. That night the regiment, which had won high praise for its gallantry during the day, retired with its corps to Centerville. It had lost in the engagement 40 killed, 101 wounded and 28 missing [1], – more than half the number taken into action. Of the dead were Captain Charles W. Carroll, First Lieutenant Warren D. Russell and Second Lieutenant Pardon Almy Jr. Previous to this two officers of the regiment had died from disease – First Lieutenant George F. Hodges on 31 January and Second Lieutenant John D. Isbell on 16 July.

Major Hayes returned to the command of the Eighteenth on 1 September. He was soon promoted to the vacant lieutenant colonelcy, Captain Thomas being made major; the commissions dated from 25 August, but it was some time later that the recipients were mustered to the new rank. During the night of the 1st and the following day the regiment marched to Chain Bridge, going on the 3d to Hall's Hill, where it rested until evening of the 6th. It then moved by night to Alexandria and staid until the 9th, thence to Fort Corcoran, opposite Georgetown, making another three-day's halt. Then began the march to the Antietam, where the Fifth Corps arrived on the 16th, but beyond supporting batteries on the east side of the creek the Eighteenth took no active part in the engagement. After the fighting was over the regiment was detailed for picket near the Burnside bridge, at the left, where it passed the 18th and the succeeding night, advancing the next day to the Potomac. It crossed that river on the 20th, leading its brigade, and opened the action of Shepherdstown, in which the two brigades commanded by Barnes and Sykes encountered four times their number of Confederates, and being unsupported were obliged to fall back. The Eighteenth retired in good order, having lost three killed, 11 wounded and one missing. Following this unsatisfactory experience, the regiment remained in camp near Sharpsburg for about six weeks.

The movement southward began on 30 October, when the column marched toward Harper's Ferry, crossed the Potomac there the following day and advanced by easy stages to Warrenton, where it went into camp on the 9th. During this time the brigade, still commanded by Colonel Barnes, had been enlarged by the addition of the One Hundred and Eighteenth Pennsylvania Regiment; the division was at that time under General Charles Griffin and the corps was commanded by General Butterfield. Camp was broken on the 17th, the regiment moving by way of Elktown to Hartwood Church, encamping there from the 19th to the 23d and then advancing to a position on the railroad near the village of Falmouth. It remained there, with the exception of a reconnaissance back to Hartwood Church on 1 December, until the 11th of that month, when it took position further down the river, opposite Fredericksburg, and remained in waiting there until the afternoon of the 13th before it was called on to join in that battle.

The call to action came at 1 o'clock, when the regiment led its division across the river, being the first of the Fifth Corps to cross. The brigade at once went to the front and relieved a brigade of the Ninth Corps which had suffered severely in an attempt to reach the enemy's line of works. A charge was made soon after by the Eighteenth, but it was not successful and cost the command heavily in killed and wounded. After falling back it was reformed and again took its place in the front of the Union line where it remained during the rest of the afternoon and in that vicinity until the evening of the next day, when it retired to the town and early the next morning as part of the rear guard covered the withdrawal of the troops from that side of the river. The loss of the regiment in this battle was 13 killed and 121 wounded [2]; among the former being Captain George C. Ruby and Second Lieutenant James B. Hancock of Cambridge, and of the nine officers wounded Captain Joseph W. Collingwood would die on the 24th. Every member of the color guard was wounded, so severe was the fire upon the colors; but not a member of the regiment was missing from his place save the killed and wounded when the ordeal was over.

=== 1864 ===
The regiment mustered out in September 1864. Men, who reenlisted or still had time left on their enlistment, were transferred to the 32nd Regiment Massachusetts Volunteer Infantry.

=== After the war ===
An association of the 18th Massachusetts Veterans was formed and met on an annual basis from 1866, with the last known reunion occurring at Hyde Park, MA in 1924. Through the efforts of Lieutenant Amasa Guild, the group was able to retrieve the State Colors in 1905 from the Museum of the Confederacy. The Colors had been lost in the Second Battle of Bull Run in 1862 and captured.

The association attempted to put together an official history of the regiment but was never able to agree on it and abandoned the project.

== Affiliations, battle honors, detailed service, and casualties ==
=== Organizational affiliation ===
Attached to:

- Fort Corcoran, Defences of Washington, to October, 1861.
- Martindale's Brigade, Porter's Division, Army of the Potomac (AoP), to March, 1862.
- 1st Brigade, 1st Division, III Corps, AoP, to May, 1862.
- 1st Brigade, 1st Division, V Corps, AoP, to March, 1864.
- 3rd Brigade, 1st Division, V Corps, AoP, to October, 1864.

=== List of battles ===
The official list of battles in which the regiment bore a part:

- Siege of Yorktown (1862)
- Second Battle of Bull Run
- Shepardstown
- Fredericksburg
- Chancellorsville
- Gettysburg
- Rappahannock Station
- Mine Run
- Wilderness
- Spottsylvania
- Battle of North Anna
- Cold Harbor
- Battle of Bethesda Church
- Petersburg
- Weldon Railroad
- Battle of Peebles's Farm

=== Detailed service ===
==== 1861 ====
- Left Massachusetts for Washington, D.C., 1 September
- Duty at Fort Corcoran, Defences of Washington, D. C, till 26 September 1861
- Hall's Hill, Va., till 10 March 1862

==== 1862 ====
- Advance on Manassas, Va., 10-16 March 1862
- Moved to Alexandria, thence to Fortress Monroe 16-23 March
- Peninsula Campaign March 16-August 28
  - Reconnaissance to Great Bethel 27 March
  - Warwick Road 5 April
  - Siege of Yorktown 5 April – 4 May
  - Battle of Hanover Court House 27 May
  - Operations about Hanover Court House 27-29 May
  - Seven days before Richmond 25 June – 1 July
  - Operations about White House Landing 26 June – 2 July
  - At Harrison's Landing till 15 August
  - Retreat from the Peninsula and movement to Centreville 15-28 August
- Second Battle of Bull Run 30 August
- Battle of Antietam, Md., 16-17 September
- Shepherdstown Ford 19 September
- Shepherdstown, W. Va., 20 September
- At Sharpsburg till 30 October
- Movement to Falmouth, Va., 30 October – 19 November
- Battle of Fredericksburg 12-15 December
- Expedition to Richards and Ellis Fords 29-30 December

==== 1863 ====
- "Mud March" January 20-24, 1863
- Duty at Falmouth till 27 April
- Chancellorsville Campaign 27 April - 6 May
  - Battle of Chancellorsville 1-5 May
- Gettysburg Campaign 11 June - 24 July
  - Ashby's Gap 21 June
  - Battle of Gettysburg 1-3 July
  - Williamsport, Md., 14 July
- At Warrenton and Beverly Ford 27 July to 17 September
- At Culpeper till 11 October
- Bristoe Campaign 11-22 October
- Advance to line of the Rappahannock 7-8 November
- Rappahannock Station 7 November
- Mine Run Campaign 26 November - 2 December
- At and near Brandy Station and Stevensburg till May 1864

==== 1864 ====
- Overland Campaign (from the Rapidan to the James) May- 18 June
  - Battles of the Wilderness 5-7 May
  - Laurel Hill 8 May
  - Spottsylvania 8-12 May
  - Spottsylvania Court House 12-21 May
  - Assault on the Salient 12 May
  - North Anna River 23-26 May
  - Jericho Ford 23 May
  - On line of the Pamunkey 26-28 May
  - Totopotomoy 28-31 May
  - Cold Harbor 1-12 June
  - Bethesda Church 1-3 June
  - Before Petersburg 16-18 June
- Siege of Petersburg 16 June to 21 October
  - Weldon Railroad 21-23 June
- 'Old members left front 20 July and mustered out 2 September 1864. Veterans and Recruits consolidated to a Battalion.'
- Poplar Springs' Church
- Peeble's Farm, 30 September – 2 October.
- 'Consolidated with 32nd Massachusetts Infantry 21 October 1864.'

== Notable members and leaders ==
- Frederick C. Anderson – Of Raynham, awarded the Medal of Honor for the capture of battle flag of 27th South Carolina (C.S.A.) and the color bearer during the Battle of Wilmington and Weldon Railroad.
- James Barnes (General) – Of Springfield, was original Commanding officer of the regiment and Division Commander during the Battle of Gettysburg. (Note: His decisions during the Battle of Gettysburg would turn out to be the most significant action in his career. The new division commander, now 61 years old (older than any other Union general present except Brig. Gen. George S. Greene), arrived early on the morning of the second day, 2 July 1863, with the rest of the V Corps. During the massive Confederate assault on the Union left flank that afternoon, one of Barnes' brigades, under Col. Strong Vincent, was detached to defend the flank at Little Round Top. The brigade performed magnificently, but Barnes had made the key decision to send it there. Barnes was also the father of US Naval Academy and Civil War veteran, John Sanford Barnes, who was later the first President of the Naval History Society.)
- Benjamin Franklin DeCosta – Of Newton Lower Falls, Massachusetts, proficient writer and Chaplain to the regiment. Although an Episcopalian during the war, he would later convert to Roman Catholicism.
- Erastus Watson Everson – Of Dedham, later worked for the Freedmen's Bureau, Internal Revenue Service Assessor, newspaper editor, and librarian of the University of South Carolina.
- Dr. David P. Smith, MD Of Springfield, regimental surgeon, noted Springfield physician.

== See also ==
- List of Massachusetts Civil War units
- Massachusetts in the Civil War
- Dedham, Massachusetts in the American Civil War
- List of Massachusetts Civil War Units
- Massachusetts in the American Civil War
