= Weldon Railroad (disambiguation) =

Weldon Railroad or Petersburg Railroad, ran from Petersburg, Virginia, to Garysburg, North Carolina in the United States.

Weldon Railroad may also refer to:

- Wilmington and Weldon Railroad, a railroad that connected to the Petersburg Railroad via Weldon
- Battle of the Weldon Railroad (disambiguation), two battles of the American Civil War
