= Battle of Old Town (U.S. Civil War 1864 Valley Campaign) =

The Battle of Old Town was a U.S. Civil War battle fought on August 2, 1864 as part of the Valley Campaign of 1864. Union forces amassed and took high ground at Oldtown, Maryland on the Potomac River in an attempt to trap Brigadier John McCausland’s Confederate States Army raiders behind Union lines.

McCausland's forces had previously sacked and burned Chambersburg, Pennsylvania, on orders of Lieutenant General Jubal A. Early. The survival of McCausland and his section of the Army of Northern Virginia is credited to a single artillery shot directed at close range by Maryland Line Lieutenant John R. McNulty from his Baltimore Light Artillery command, which was supporting Brigadier Bradley Tyler Johnson’s 1st Maryland Infantry. Lieutenant (later Major) McNulty’s shot was called “one of the most brilliant achievements of the war” by historian Scott C. Patchan.

== See also ==
- Valley Campaigns of 1864
- U.S. Civil War
