= Joseph Hayes (general) =

Brigadier general of the Union Army during the American Civil War

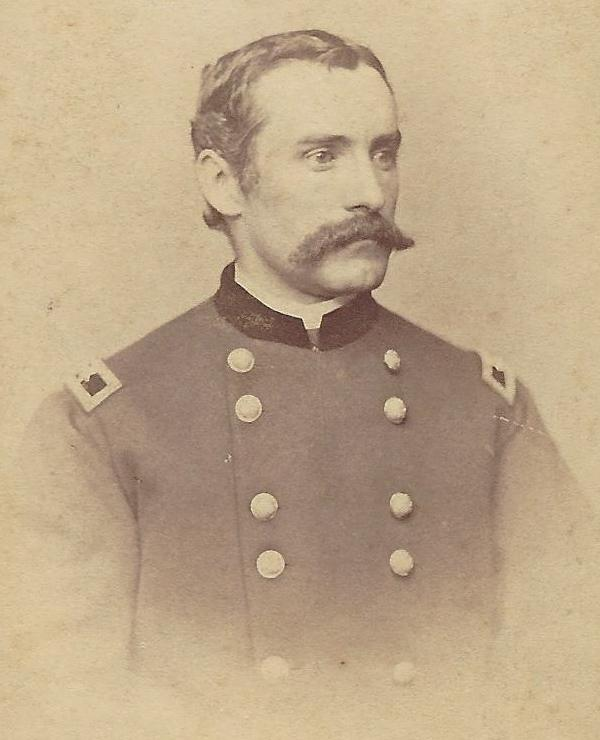
- Photographic portrait (c. 1864–65)
- Born: September 14, 1835; South Berwick, Maine
- Died: August 19, 1912 (aged 76); New York City, New York
- Burial place: South Berwick
- Military career
- Allegiance: Union
- Branch: Union Army
- Rank: Brigadier general Bvt. Major general
- Wars: Utah War; American Civil War; Peninsula Campaign; Battle of Fredericksburg; Battle of Chancellorsville; Battle of Gettysburg; Overland Campaign; Battle of the Wilderness (WIA); Siege of Petersburg; Battle of Globe Tavern (POW); Appomattox Campaign

Joseph Hayes (September 14, 1835 – August 19, 1912) was a Union Army general during the American Civil War. The Harvard-educated civil engineer served as regiment and brigade commander in the V Corps. As part of the Army of the Potomac he fought in many battles of the Eastern Theater of the war.

== Early life ==
Joseph Hayes was born in South Berwick, Maine, September 14, 1835. He was the son of Judge William Allen Hayes. The younger Hayes prepared for college at the Phillips-Exeter Academy. After graduating from Harvard in 1855 and taking a course in civil engineering he went West and engaged in the preliminary surveys of the Iowa line of the Chicago & Rock Island Railway.

In 1858 the Mormon outbreak occurred in Utah. Hayes joined a volunteer company of artillery from Iowa and was elected its captain, being commissioned by Governor Samuel J. Kirkwood.

== American Civil War ==
=== Early war ===
When the civil war begun Hayes resided in Massachusetts. He offered his services to the state and originally was appointed captain of Company A, 20th Massachusetts Infantry Regiment; however on the next day, July 26, 1861, he was named major of the 18th Massachusetts Infantry Regiment. Major Hayes went to the front with his regiment, and served through the Peninsula campaign. When Lieutenant Colonel Timothy lngraham was promoted, Hayes succeeded him on 25th of August, 1862. As lieutenant colonel, Hayes commanded the regiment in the Battle of Fredericksburg, being commended for his conduct. The regiment made three successive charges on Marye's Heights, more than one-half of its officers and men were killed or disabled. A lieutenant recalled: "Colonel Hayes threw his arms about me and almost cried at this wicked murder".

On November 29, 1862, Hayes became colonel of the regiment on the promotion of Colonel Barnes to brigadier general. As colonel, he commanded his regiment in the Battle of Chancellorsville and also the rear guard in the retreat of the army, and was engaged in several subsequent skirmishes. He commanded his regiment in the Battle of Gettysburg, injuring his leg on the second day when his horse fell on him. Nevertheless he was with his unit on the third day, leading his men and the 22nd Massachusetts opposing Pickett's Charge.

On the 1st of September, 1863, Hayes took command of the 1st Brigade, 1st Division, V Corps. He was injured again when thrown from his horse on September 24. Mere days later he was assigned to lead the 3rd Brigade, doing so until April 1864.

=== Later war ===
Hayes then returned to his regiment and led it in the Battle of the Wilderness. He headed the advance line of an attack column which broke the enemy's position, taking many prisoners. He received a severe wound in the head during the fighting of the first day, and was sent to the hospital at Washington.

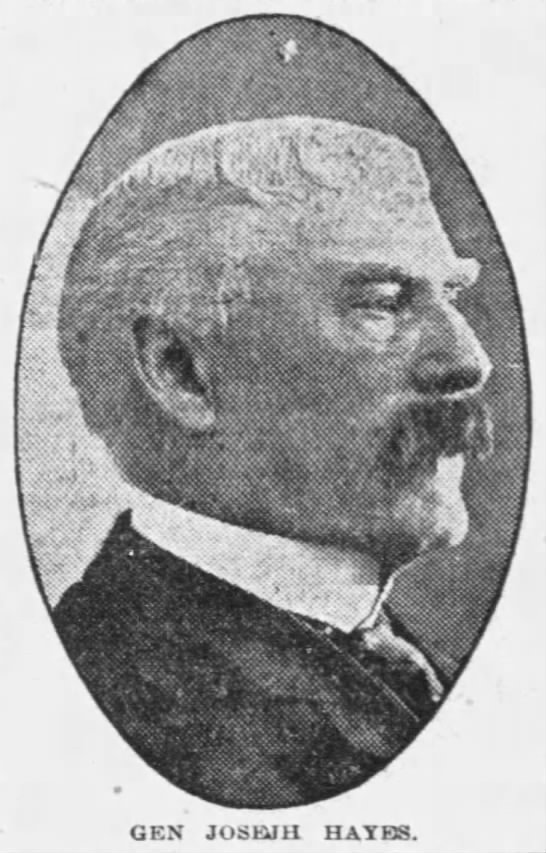
General Joseph Hayes in old age, from his obituary in The Boston Globe (August 20, 1912)

Hayes was commissioned brigadier general of volunteers from May 12, 1864, and once recovered was assigned to the command of a brigade in Romeyn B. Ayres's division of the V Corps. He held the command of the regular infantry brigade during the Siege of Petersburg, and the subsequent capture of the Weldon Railroad by his command on August 18, 1864. The Confederates made a desperate attempt to recapture this important communication to their base of supplies, attacking with thirteen brigades, but were repulsed. the defenders suffered heavy losses, including both aid-de-camps of Hayes, Lieutenants Chambers McKibbin and Perry being shot by his side. The day following, accompanied by his adjutant-general Captain George W. Brady, while making a reconnaissance in front of the lines in a thick wood, General Hayes was captured and taken prisoner. He was for several months confined in Libby Prison, Richmond, Virginia. While a prisoner of war, in January, 1865, he was appointed commissioner of supplies in the seceded states by the U.S. Government, and performed the duty of distributing a large amount of clothing and food among the Union prisoners in the South.

Upon his release and return to the field he was assigned to the command of two consolidated brigades, leading the advance of the V Army Corps in its pursuit of the Confederate Army of Northern Virginia and the most advanced line of battle at the Battle of Appomattox Court House. Hayes was mustered out on the 24th of August, 1865. He was brevetted major general of volunteers for his services at Weldon Railroad, dated to March 13, 1865.

== Later life ==
After the war Hayes became widely known as a mining engineer. In 1877 he introduced the American system of hydraulic mining to Colombia. He also worked as broker and headed a coal company in New York City before retiring in reclusion to Pennsylvania. General Hayes died in a private sanitarium at 154 West 74th St., New York City, on August 19, 1912. He never married. Joseph Hayes was buried at South Berwick.

== See also ==
- List of American Civil War generals (Union)

== Sources ==
- Bowen, James L. (1889). Massachusetts in the War, 1861–1865. Springfield, MA: Clark W. Bryan & Co. pp. 935–36.
- Eicher, John H. and David J. (2001). Civil War High Commands. Stanford, CA: Stanford University Press. ISBN 0-8047-3641-3.
- Horn, John (2015). The Siege of Petersburg: The Battles for the Weldon Railroad, August 1864. California: Savas Beatie. pp. 124, 126, 129, 144–46, 157–59.
- Parker, John L. (1887). History of the Twenty-Second Massachusetts Infantry, the Second Company Sharpshooters, and the Third Light Battery, in the War of the Rebellion. Boston: The Regimental Association. Press of Rand Avery Company. pp. 357, 371, 374.
- Rable, George C. (2002). Fredericksburg! Fredericksburg! Chapel Hill and London: The University of North Carolina Press. p. 257.
- Rhea, Gordon C. (1994). The Battle of the Wilderness, May 5–6, 1864. Baton Rouge and London: Louisiana State University Press. pp. 101, 102, 125, 152, 154–57.
- Warner, Ezra J. (1964). Generals in Blue: Lives of the Union Commanders. Baton Rouge, LA: Louisiana State University Press. ISBN 0-8071-0822-7.
- Wilson, J. G.; Fiske, J., eds. (1892). "Hayes, Joseph". Appletons' Cyclopædia of American Biography. Vol. 3. New York: D. Appleton. p. 133.
- "Gen Hayes Dies in New York". The Boston Globe. Tuesday, August 20, 1912. p. 13.
