= John R. McNulty =

- Born: 1832; Baltimore, Maryland, U.S.
- Died: January 11, 1912 (aged 79–80); Blauvelt, New York, U.S.
- Military career
- Allegiance: Confederate States of America
- Branch: Artillery
- Rank: Major
- Unit: Baltimore Light Artillery
- Conflicts: American Civil War; Battle of Old Town; Battle of Tom's Brook

Lieutenant John R. McNulty (1832 – January 11, 1912) of Baltimore, Maryland was a Confederate soldier. During the Battle of Old Town, his 2nd Maryland Artillery prevented an element of the Army of Northern Virginia led by Brigadier General John McCausland from being trapped behind Union lines. At the time, the unit was returning from raids into Maryland and Pennsylvania, where they had sacked and burned Chambersburg, Pennsylvania. After the civil war, he served as a presidential elector for James A. Garfield in 1881.

== Battle of Old Town ==
The Valley Campaigns of 1864 were part of a strategy to save the Confederate breadbasket for the provision of the Army of Northern Virginia from Major General David Hunter and, later, General Philip Sheridan and to threaten Washington, D.C. This was part of the larger strategy of Generals Robert E. Lee and Joseph E. Johnston for the outnumbered and out-resourced Confederate States Army to break the Northern population's resolve and force the Union to sue for peace by taking the battle to Northern soil while bogging down advancing Union Army troops.

During these campaigns, forces of Brigadier General John McCausland were being pursued by Federal troops when they were blocked at Old Town, Maryland at the Potomac River between Hancock, Maryland and Springfield, West Virginia by Union infantry and an armored train armed with a 12 lbs howitzer. During the ensuing battle, McNulty brought his horse drawn light cannon to high ground within 200 yards of the armored train. The first cannon shot breached and exploded the train's boiler, causing Federal troops both within and without the train to scatter. A second shot, passed through one of the train's howitzer car's open musket portals, disabling the howitzer and forcing the crew to evacuate. Pursued by the Confederates, the frontal Union troops surrendered, allowing McCausland's forces to return to the relative safety of West Virginia without further incident.

== Later American Civil War events ==
During the October 9, 1864 Battle of Tom's Brook, McNulty saved and repositioned Confederate guns to high ground when Major General Thomas Rosser's Laurel Brigade (whom the Baltimore Light Artillery were supporting) broke and ran. However, he later lost all but one of the surviving guns when chased by Federal troops after the battle. McNulty's Baltimore Light Artillery had lost 4 guns and 19 of their crews in the battling at Tom's Brook. McNulty remained in command of the Baltimore Light Artillery until the April 9, 1865 Battle of Appomattox Courthouse which was the final U.S. Civil War engagement of the Army of Northern Virginia. By then, however, his forces had been so depleted that they were not able to participate in the battle.

While referred to in histories as "Lieutenant" or "the Lieutenant", McNulty was repeatedly promoted during the war, eventually holding the rank of major.

A memorial to 2nd Maryland Artillery (Baltimore Light Artillery) at the Antietam National Battlefield lists McNulty by name.

== Later life ==
After the war, McNulty continued to live in Baltimore, Maryland, where he served as a presidential elector for James A. Garfield in 1881. He moved to New York in 1877, and was one of the founders of the New York Coffee Exchange in 1882. He died at his home in Blauvelt on January 11, 1912.

== See also ==
- Valley Campaigns of 1864
- Maryland Line (CSA)
- Trevilian Station Confederate order of battle, section Army of Northern Virginia
