= George H. Covode =

George Hay Covode
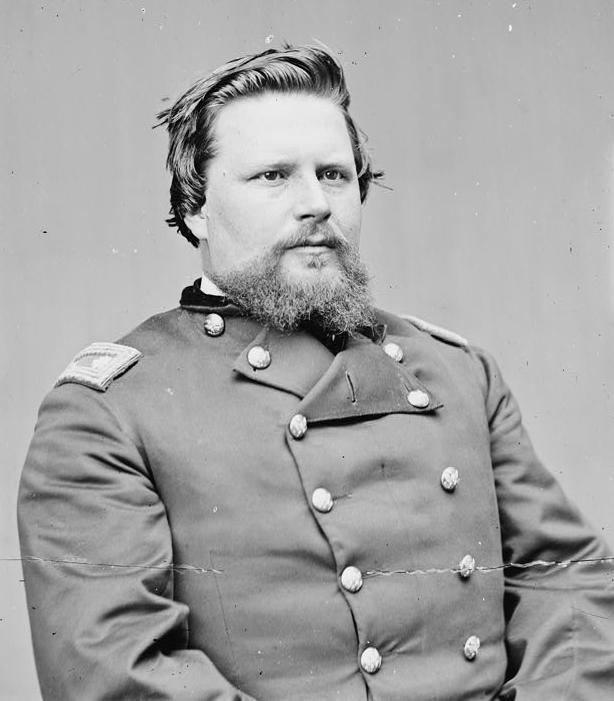
- Col. George H. Covode
- Born: August 19, 1835; Covodesville, Pennsylvania
- Died: June 24, 1864 (aged 28); Virginia
- Burial place: West Fairfield Cemetery, Westmoreland County, Pennsylvania
- Relatives: John Covode (father)
- Military career
- Allegiance: United States of America; Union
- Branch: Union Army
- Service years: 1861 - 1864
- Rank: Colonel
- Unit: 4th Pennsylvania Cavalry
- Wars: American Civil War: Battle of Malvern Hill; Second Battle of Bull Run; Battle of Antietam; Battle of Fredericksburg; Battle of Chancellorsville; Battle of Gettysburg

George Hay Covode (August 19, 1835 – June 25, 1864) was a Pennsylvania merchant and a colonel of cavalry in the Union Army during the American Civil War.

== Early life ==
Born in Covodesville, Pennsylvania, Covode was the oldest son of John Covode, a U.S. congressman and staunch abolitionist. In his youth, George Covode was noted for his athletic proportions, being tall and well built and peculiarly fitted for the hardships of military life. He was educated in Ligonier Academy and Elders Ridge. After he left school, he engaged in mercantile pursuits for some years, but not with much success. In 1858, he married Annie Earl of Somerset County, Pennsylvania, who died a few months after their marriage. He remarried a few years afterwards to Bettie St. Clair Robb, a granddaughter of Arthur St. Clair, a major general in the Continental Army and the ninth President of the Continental Congress. The two had one child, Sarah.

== Civil War ==
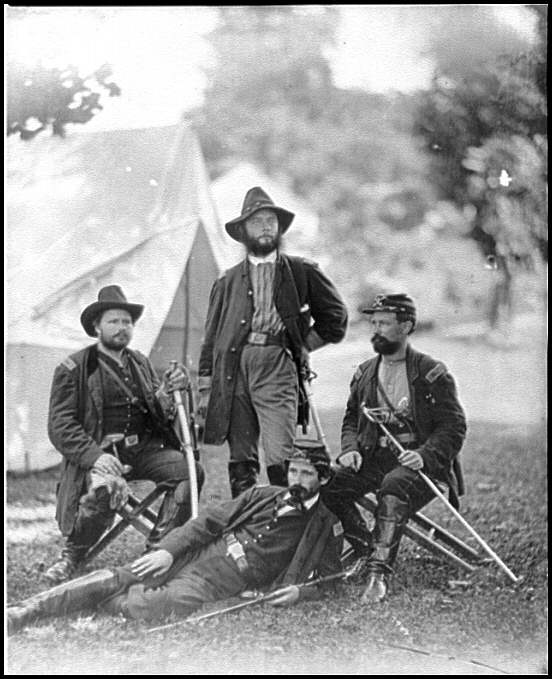
Col. James H. Childs and officers of the 4th Pennsylvania Cavalry at Antietam, with Covode at left (1862)

At the start of the Civil War in 1861, Covode enlisted as a private in Company D of the 4th Pennsylvania Volunteer Cavalry, raised in Ligonier Valley, Pennsylvania. During the election of officers, he was chosen as first lieutenant. The company was soon transferred to Camp Campbell near Soldiers' Home in Washington, D.C. Covode was later promoted to captain of the company, and on March 12, 1862, to major as the 4th Pennsylvania was moved rapidly to the front.

Covode and his men marched to Yorktown, Virginia, and soon saw action in the battles of Malvern Hill and the Second Bull Run. During the fall of 1862, the regiment was encamped on the north bank of the Potomac River near Hancock, Maryland, but soon participated in the fighting at Antietam, and later at Fredericksburg.

In 1863, Covode fought at Chancellorsville, Gettysburg and others. On one occasion in Falls Church, Virginia, Covode and his troops were entirely surrounded by the Confederate troops, but dashing against them he used his sword so skillfully that he opened a way for his men to follow and all escaped. His strength made him a power in hand-to-hand contests of this kind, but in addition he was almost without any personal fear. In camp life, he was described as jovial and was always unusually good natured.

He was promoted to lieutenant colonel on December 8, 1863, and was made a full colonel on May 28, 1864.

=== Death ===
Covode was known to be very near-sighted, which caused trouble for him in identifying people at a far distance. On June 24, 1864, while in command of a brigade in Virginia, he mistook some Confederate skirmishers for his own troops and rode toward them. He discovered his mistake too late and, as he was turning to ride away, he was shot in the arm and stomach by an enemy volley. In the retreat, he was left within the enemy lines and died a few hours later.

He was interred in West Fairfield Cemetery in Westmoreland County, Pennsylvania.
