= Battle of Trevilian Station order of battle: Confederate =

The following units and commanders fought in the Battle of Trevilian Station of the American Civil War on the Confederate side. The Union order of battle is shown separately. Order of battle compiled from the corps organization during the battle, from the casualty returns and the reports.

== Abbreviations used ==
=== Military rank ===
- MG = Major General
- BG = Brigadier General
- Col = Colonel
- Ltc = Lieutenant Colonel
- Maj = Major
- Cpt = Captain
- Lt = Lieutenant

=== Other ===
- (w) = wounded
- (k) = killed in action
- (c) = captured

== Army of Northern Virginia ==
=== Cavalry Corps ===
MG Wade Hampton

Division	Brigade	Regiments and Others
Hampton's Division; MG Wade Hampton	Young's Brigade Col Gilbert J. Wright	7th Georgia: Ltc Joseph L. McAllister (k), Maj Edward C. Anderson, Jr. (w&c), Maj John N. Davies; Cobb's (Georgia) Legion: Ltc Barrington S. King (w); Phillips (Georgia) Legion: Ltc William W. Rich; 20th Georgia Battalion: Ltc Samuel B. Spencer; Jeff. Davis (Mississippi) Legion: Ltc Joseph F. Waring
Hampton's Division; MG Wade Hampton	Rosser's Brigade BG Thomas L. Rosser (w); Col Richard H. Dulany	7th Virginia: Col Richard H. Dulany; 11th Virginia: Col Oliver R. Funsten; 12th Virginia: Ltc Thomas B. Massie; 35th Virginia Battalion: Ltc Elijah V. White
Hampton's Division; MG Wade Hampton	Butler's Brigade BG Matthew C. Butler	4th South Carolina: Col B. Huger Rutledge; 5th South Carolina: Maj Joseph H. Morgan; 6th South Carolina: Col Hugh K. Aiken (w), Maj Thomas B. Ferguson
Fitzhugh Lee's Division; MG Fitzhugh Lee	Wickham's Brigade BG Williams C. Wickham	1st Virginia: Ltc William A. Morgan; 2nd Virginia: Col Thomas T. Munford; 3rd Virginia: Col Thomas H. Owen; 4th Virginia: Col William B. Wooldridge
Fitzhugh Lee's Division; MG Fitzhugh Lee	Lomax's Brigade BG Lunsford L. Lomax	5th Virginia: Cpt Ruben Boston; 6th Virginia: Col John S. Green; 15th Virginia: Col Charles R. Collins
Independent Command	Maryland Line (detachment)	1st Maryland Battalion: Col Bradley T. Johnson; Baltimore Light Artillery: Lt John R. McNulty
Horse Artillery Maj R. Preston Chew	Breathed's Battalion Maj James Breathed	Hart's (South Carolina) Battery: Cpt James Hart; Thomson's (Virginia) Battery: Lt James W. Thomson; Shoemaker's (Virginia) Battery: Cpt John J. Shoemaker; Johnston's (Virginia) Battery: Cpt Phillip P. Johnston
