= Camp Union =

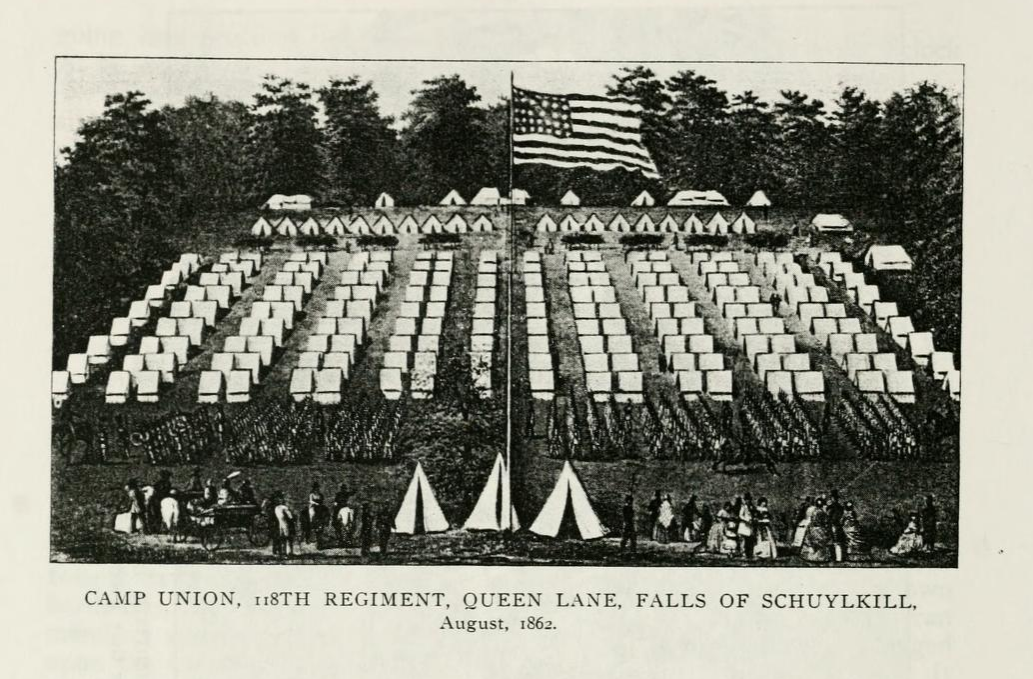
118th Regiment at Camp Union, August 1862

Camp Union was a military training center for the Union Army during the American Civil War. Constructed near Philadelphia, Pennsylvania, the camp operated from 1861 until 1865, and primarily served various Pennsylvania volunteer regiments.

The camp, one of 17 training sites in the greater Philadelphia region, was located north of Ridge Road (now Ridge Avenue), not far from the Falls of the Schuylkill River. Thousands of recruits were mustered into Federal service, and were drilled and taught military tactics before their regiments were sent to the South.

== See also ==
- 118th Pennsylvania Infantry - Mustered at Camp Union.
