= 118th Pennsylvania Infantry Regiment =

Union Army volunteer infantry regiment

118th Pennsylvania Volunteer Infantry
- Pennsylvania flag
- Active: August 1862 – June 1, 1865
- Disbanded: June 1, 1865
- Country: United States
- Allegiance: Union
- Branch: Infantry
- Size: 1,276
- Part of: 1st Brigade, 1st Division, V Corps, Army of the Potomac
- Nickname: Corn Exchange Regiment
- Engagements: American Civil War: Battle of Shepherdstown; Battle of Fredericksburg; Battle of Chancellorsville; Battle of Gettysburg; Battle of the Wilderness; Battle of Spotsylvania Court House; Battle of Five Forks

Commanders
- Notable commanders: Charles M. Prevost; James Gwyn

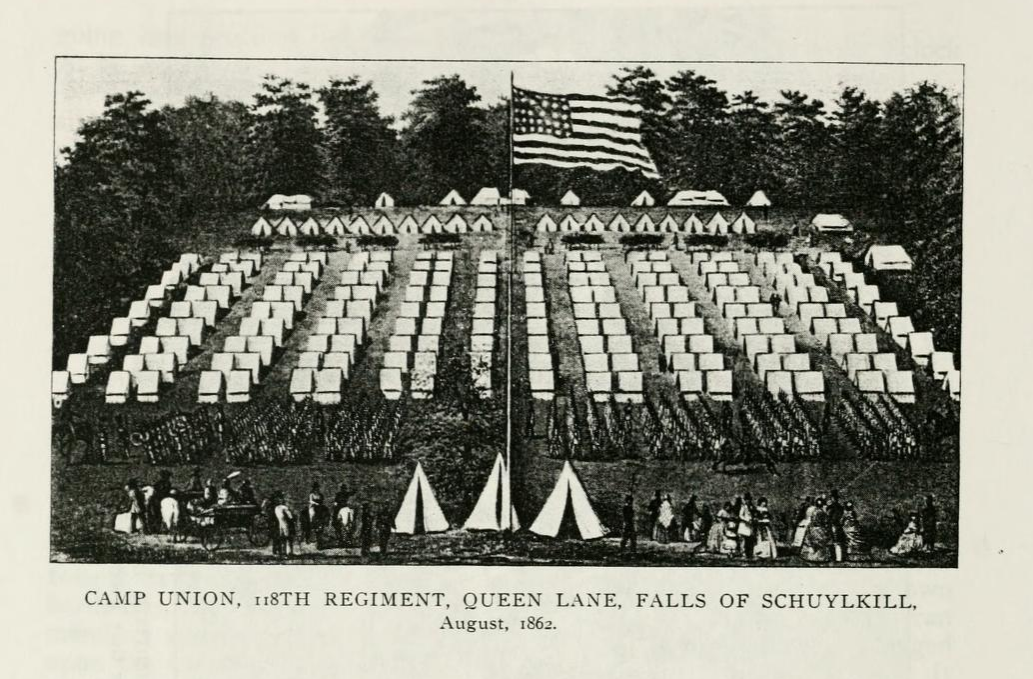
118th Regiment at Camp Union, August 1862

The 118th Pennsylvania Regiment was a volunteer infantry regiment in the Union Army during the American Civil War. They participated in several major conflicts during the war including the Battle of Gettysburg, Siege of Petersburg, and escorted the truce flag of Robert E. Lee at the Battle of Five Forks. The regiment was led by Colonel Charles Prevost until he was seriously injured at the Battle of Shepherdstown in which Lieutenant-Colonel James Gwyn assumed command until the end of the war.

It was also known as the Corn Exchange Regiment because a bounty of $10 for each man, as well as the funds necessary for raising the regiment, were furnished by the Corn Exchange Association with their hall at 2nd and Gold Streets in Philadelphia.

== History ==
The regiment initially rendezvoused at Camp Union at Philadelphia, where it was mustered into Federal service on August 30, 1862, for a three-year term. The field officers were Charles M. Provost as colonel, James Gwyn as lieutenant colonel and Charles P. Herring as major. The regiment was ordered at once to Washington, D.C., as part of the Army of the Potomac. Assigned to the 1st Brigade, 1st Division, V Corps, it reached Antietam on September 16, but was held in reserve during the ensuing engagement. At Blackford's Ford, near Shepherdstown, it saw its first fight on September 20, and lost 282 men out of a strength of 800. Several officers were among those killed or wounded. A number drowned in the Potomac River trying to escape from a sudden counterattack by the division of A.P. Hill. Colonel Provost was made brevet brigadier general for gallantry in this battle. (As of 2004, the Shepherdstown Battlefield was threatened by development).

The regiment moved south in early November and took part in the Battle of Fredericksburg, where it joined in the assault on Marye's Heights and suffered severely. During the infamous "Mud March" in January, 1863, the 118th was involved in a riot, fueled by a whiskey ration, with two other units, the 22nd Massachusetts and the 2nd Maine. The men of the 118th PA and the 22nd MA came to blows after accusations flew that the Massachusetts regiment failed to support the Pennsylvanians at Shepherdstown. Somehow, the 2nd Maine became involved and a 3 regiment free-for-all ensued, fizzling out only after the participants became exhausted. After the "Mud March", the 118th returned to camp at Falmouth, which it occupied until April 27, 1863. It was closely engaged at the Battle of Chancellorsville, again suffering considerable casualties.

The 118th was in camp at Falmouth until June 10 when the Army of the Potomac commenced its northward movement for the Gettysburg campaign. The Corn Exchange Regiment acted as support in the cavalry engagements of Aldie, Upperville and Middleburg. The regiment reached Gettysburg early on July 2, 1863. At four o'clock that afternoon, the 118th went into action in support of Maj. Gen. Daniel Sickles' III Corps and was closely engaged, with 3 killed, 19 wounded, and 3 missing or captured. On the 3rd, the regiment was moved to Big Round Top, where it remained without engagement. Following the battle, it then joined in the pursuit of the retreating Confederates and encountered the enemy on July 4.

On September 30, 1863, Prevost officially retired, and Gwyn was promoted to colonel and the commanding officer of the 118th. During this time, Prevost had been stationed as commandant of a military prison in Elmira, New York.

At camp in Beverly Ford, Virginia in August and September, about 300 recruits were received. During this period, five bounty jumpers from among the new recruits were recaptured after deserting from the Regiment, and sentenced to death. Appeals were sent all the way to President Lincoln, who decided that the desertion of bounty jumpers was becoming too severe a problem and denied the appeal. The execution of the five deserters took place with the entire V Corps assembled to witness the shooting on August 29, 1863.

After participating in the Mine Run campaign, the regiment returned to winter quarters at Beverly Ford. On May 1, 1864, it started for the Wilderness, where it was engaged. It also fought at Spotsylvania Court House, the North Anna River, Mechanicsville, Totopotomoy Creek, and Petersburg.

During the siege of Petersburg, the 118th remained in the trenches until August 15. It then joined in the movement upon the Wilmington and Weldon Railroad, was posted near Yellow House in September, and joined in the Hatcher's Run movement in October, the raid on the Weldon Railroad in December, and the engagement at Dabney's Mill in February 1865. On April 1, it participated in the Battle of Five Forks and continued the pursuit to Appomattox Court House, where its brigade received the arms and flags of General Robert E. Lee's army.

On April 15, the regiment started for Washington, D.C., where it was mustered out on June 1, 1865. The late-1864 recruits were transferred to the 91st Pennsylvania Infantry.

== Casualties ==
- Killed or mortally wounded: 9 officers, 132 enlisted men
- Wounded: 6 officers, 67 enlisted men
- Captured or missing: ? officers, ? enlisted men
- Died of disease: 1 officer, 111 enlisted men
- Total: ? officers, ? enlisted men

== Legacy ==
A group based in the United Kingdom currently represents Company C and belongs to the American Civil War Society. Their website can be found here

The 103rd Engineer Battalion (United States) of the 28th Division, Pennsylvania National Guard, traces a lineage back through the 118th Pennsylvania Infantry.

== See also ==
- List of Pennsylvania Civil War regiments
