= Benjamin Franklin DeCosta =

American novelist (1831–1904)

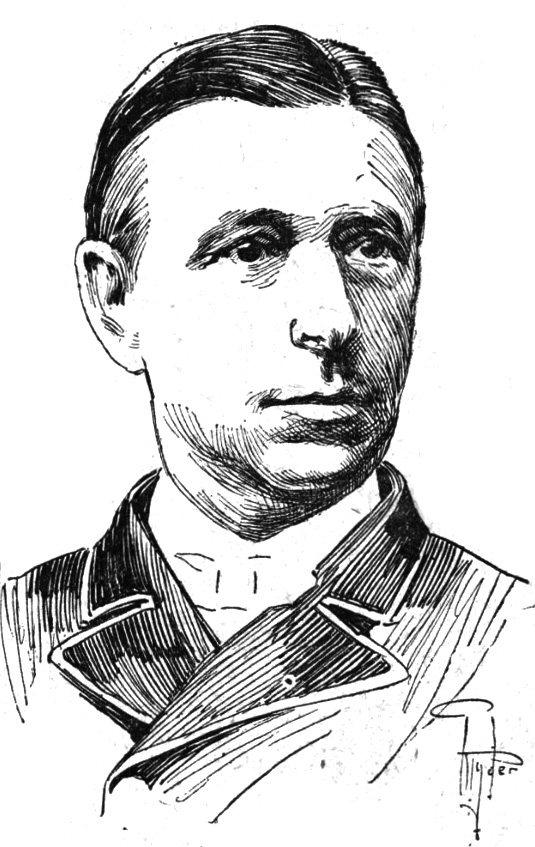

Benjamin Franklin DeCosta or de Costa (July 10, 1831 – November 4, 1904) was an American clergyman and historical writer.

== Biography ==
He was born in Charlestown, Massachusetts, and graduated in 1856 at the Biblical Institute at Concord, New Hampshire (later part of Boston University), became a minister in the Episcopal Church in 1857, and during the next three years was a rector first at North Adams, and then at Newton Lower Falls, Massachusetts.

After serving as chaplain in the 18th Massachusetts Volunteer Infantry and one other Massachusetts regiment during the first two years of the American Civil War, he became editor (1863) of The Christian Times in New York City, and subsequently edited The Episcopalian and The Magazine of American History. He was rector of the Church of St John the Evangelist in New York City from 1881 to 1899, at which time he resigned while converting to Roman Catholicism.

He was one of the organizers and long the secretary of the Church Temperance Society, and founded and was the first president (1884–1899) of the American branch of the White Cross Society. He became a high authority on early American cartography and the history of the period of exploration. In addition to numerous monographs and valuable contributions to Justin Winsor's Narrative and Critical History of America, he published The Pre-Columbian Discovery of America by the Northmen (1868); The Northmen in Maine (1870); The Moabite Stone (1871); The Rector of Roxburgh (1871), a novel under the nom de plume of William Hickling; and Verrazano the Explorer; being a Vindication of his Letter and Voyage (1880). He died in New York City in 1904.
