= John Sanford Barnes =

American lawyer

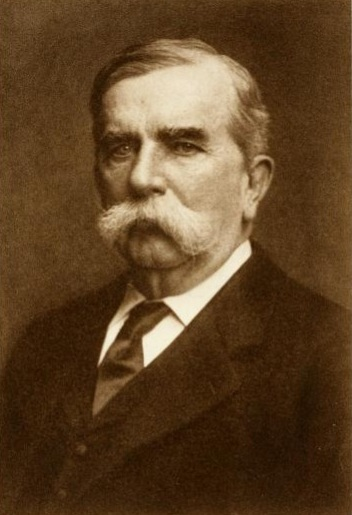
- Born: May 12, 1836; West Point, New York, U.S.
- Died: November 22, 1911 (aged 75); New York City, New York, U.S.
- Occupations: Businessman and navy historian

John Sanford Barnes (May 12, 1836 – November 22, 1911) was a United States Navy officer and businessman and naval historian.

== Biography ==
Barnes was born at West Point, New York, in 1836, while his father, General James Barnes, served as an instructor there. He entered the US Naval Academy at Annapolis, Maryland, at age 14, serving after his graduation aboard Preble, and under Commodore Stewart on San Jacinto in Europe and the West Indies, and on Saratoga. He was aboard Arctic when it participated in the first survey for the original Atlantic cable in 1856. The following year, aged 21, he was appointed assistant professor of ethics at the US Naval Academy, and after a subsequent year in private business he was appointed master of Jamestown.

In 1858 he resigned his commission and attended Albany Law School. After passing the bar he practiced law until 1861. During the American Civil War, he returned to the Union Navy, initially as navigator of Wabash, and later as commander of USS Dawn, USS Paul Jones, USS Lenape, and USS Bat. In 1863 he married Susan Bainbridge Hayes, granddaughter of Commodore William Bainbridge and great-grandniece of Admiral John Barry. After the War, he served as commander of the Naval Academy's practice ships USS Marblehead and USS Savannah, as an instructor at the Academy, and wrote "Submarine Warfare": the first major work on the use of torpedoes. He left the navy as lieutenant commander.

From 1869 to 1880 he was in private business, largely engaged in obtaining financing for what was to become the Great Northern Railway. He devoted time also to collecting memorabilia of the Navy during the American Revolution and War of 1812. He served as the first President of the Naval History Society and edited the first volume of its publications, "The Log Books of the Serapis, Alliance, and Ariel," before his death in 1911. His manuscript collections and library formed the basis of the Naval History Society's collections, and were donated to the Society in 1915, by his son Col. James Barnes. The Collections became part of the New-York Historical Society when the Naval History Society moved there in 1925.

== Death and burial ==
Barnes died in New York City on November 22, 1911. He was buried at Woodlawn Cemetery in the Bronx.
