= Battle of Globe Tavern order of battle: Confederate =

The following units and commanders of the Confederate army fought in the Battle of Globe Tavern from August 18 to 21, 1864. The Union order of battle is listed separately.

== Abbreviations used ==
=== Military rank ===
- Gen = General
- LTG = Lieutenant General
- MG = Major General
- BG = Brigadier General
- Col = Colonel
- Ltc = Lieutenant Colonel
- Maj = Major
- Cpt = Captain
- Lt = Lieutenant

=== Other ===
- (w) = wounded
- (mw) = mortally wounded
- (k) = killed in action
- (c) = captured

== August 18–19 ==
=== Operations south of Petersburg ===
Gen P. G. T. Beauregard, Petersburg Defense Force

==== Third Corps, Army of Northern Virginia ====
Division	Brigade	Regiments and Others
Mahone's Division; MG William Mahone	Weisiger's Brigade BG David A. Weisiger	6th Virginia Infantry; 12th Virginia Infantry; 16th Virginia Infantry; 41st Virginia Infantry; 61st Virginia Infantry
Mahone's Division; MG William Mahone	Colquitt's Brigade (from Hoke's Division); BG Alfred H. Colquitt	6th Georgia Infantry; 19th Georgia Infantry; 23rd Georgia Infantry; 27th Georgia Infantry; 28th Georgia Infantry
Mahone's Division; MG William Mahone	Clingman's Brigade (from Hoke's Division); BG Thomas L. Clingman (w); Col Hector M. McKethan	8th North Carolina Infantry; 31st North Carolina Infantry; 51st North Carolina Infantry: Col Hector M. McKethan; 61st North Carolina Infantry
Heth's Division; MG Henry Heth	Davis' Brigade Cpt Robert W. Thomas	1st Confederate Battalion; 2nd Mississippi Infantry; 11th Mississippi Infantry: Maj Reuben O. Reynolds; 26th Mississippi Infantry; 42nd Mississippi Infantry; 55th North Carolina Infantry
Heth's Division; MG Henry Heth	Walker's Brigade Col Robert M. Mayo (ill, August 18); Col William S. Christian	13th Alabama Infantry; 2nd Maryland Battalion; 1st Tennessee Infantry (Provisional Army); 7th Tennessee Infantry; 14th Tennessee Infantry; 40th Virginia Infantry; 47th Virginia Infantry; 55th Virginia Infantry: Col William S. Christian; 22nd Virginia Infantry Battalion
Heth's Division; MG Henry Heth	Colquitt's Brigade (from Hoke's Division); BG Alfred H. Colquitt	6th Georgia Infantry; 19th Georgia Infantry; 23rd Georgia Infantry; 27th Georgia Infantry; 28th Georgia Infantry
Third Corps Artillery; Col Reuben L. Walker	Pegram's Battalion Col William Pegram	Crenshaw (Virginia) Artillery: Capt. Thomas Ellett; Letcher (Virginia) Artillery: Capt. Thomas A. Brander; Purcell (Virginia) Artillery: Capt. George M. Cayce; Fredericksburg (Virginia) Artillery: Capt. Edward A. Marye

== August 21 ==
=== Operations south of Petersburg ===
Gen P.G.T. Beauregard, Petersburg Defense Force

==== Third Corps, Army of Northern Virginia ====
LTG A. P. Hill

Division	Brigade	Regiments and Others
Mahone's Division; MG William Mahone	Sanders' Brigade BG John C. C. Sanders (k); Col J. Horace King	8th Alabama Infantry; 9th Alabama Infantry: Col J. Horace King; 10th Alabama Infantry; 11th Alabama Infantry; 13th Alabama Infantry; 14th Alabama Infantry
Mahone's Division; MG William Mahone	Harris' Brigade Col Joseph M. Jayne	12th Mississippi Infantry; 16th Mississippi Infantry: Col Edward G. Counsell (mw); 19th Mississippi Infantry; 48th Mississippi Infantry
Mahone's Division; MG William Mahone	Wright's Brigade BG Ambrose R. Wright	3rd Georgia Infantry; 22nd Georgia Infantry; 48th Georgia Infantry; 64th Georgia Infantry; 2nd Georgia Infantry Battalion; 10th Georgia Infantry Battalion
Mahone's Division; MG William Mahone	Hagood's Brigade (from Hoke's Division); BG Johnson Hagood	11th South Carolina Infantry; 21st South Carolina Infantry; 25th South Carolina Infantry; 27th South Carolina Infantry: Col Peter Charles Gaillard; 7th South Carolina Infantry Battalion: Cpt John L. Jones
Mahone's Division; MG William Mahone	Finegan's Brigade BG Joseph Finegan	2nd Florida Infantry; 5th Florida Infantry; 8th Florida Infantry; 9th Florida Infantry: Cpt John William Pearson of Company B (mw); 10th Florida Infantry; 11th Florida Infantry
Heth's Division; MG Henry Heth	Cooke's Brigade BG John R. Cooke	15th North Carolina Infantry; 27th North Carolina Infantry; 46th North Carolina Infantry; 48th North Carolina Infantry; 55th North Carolina Infantry
Heth's Division; MG Henry Heth	McRae's Brigade BG William MacRae	11th North Carolina Infantry; 26th North Carolina Infantry; 44th North Carolina Infantry; 47th North Carolina Infantry: Ltc John W. Lyell (w); 52nd North Carolina Infantry
Heth's Division; MG Henry Heth	Kirkland's Brigade (from Hoke's Division); BG William W. Kirkland	17th North Carolina Infantry; 42nd North Carolina Infantry; 66th North Carolina Infantry
Heth's Division; MG Henry Heth	Ransom's Brigade (from Johnson's Division); Ltc John L. Harris	24th North Carolina Infantry; 25th North Carolina Infantry; 35th North Carolina Infantry; 49th North Carolina Infantry; 56th North Carolina Infantry
Third Corps Artillery; Col Reuben L. Walker	Pegram's Battalion Col William Pegram	Crenshaw (Virginia) Artillery: Capt. Thomas Ellett; Letcher (Virginia) Artillery: Capt. Thomas A. Brander; Purcell (Virginia) Artillery: Capt. George M. Cayce; Fredericksburg (Virginia) Artillery: Capt. Edward A. Marye

==== Cavalry Corps, Army of Northern Virginia ====
Division	Brigade	Regiments and Others
W.H.F. Lee's Division	Barringer's Brigade BG Rufus Barringer	1st North Carolina Cavalry; 2nd North Carolina Cavalry; 3rd North Carolina Cavalry; 5th North Carolina Cavalry
W.H.F. Lee's Division	Dearing's Brigade BG James Dearing	7th Confederate Cavalry; 62nd Georgia Cavalry; 4th North Carolina Cavalry; 6th North Carolina Cavalry; Petersburg Artillery

== Sources ==
- Calkins, Chris. "The Battle of Weldon Railroad (or Globe Tavern), August 18–19 & 21, 1864", in Blue & Gray, Volume XXIII, issue 5 (Winter 2007). ISSN 0741-2207.
- Horn, John. The Siege of Petersburg: The Battles for the Weldon Railroad August 1864. El Dorado Hills, California: Savas Beatie, 2015.
- Katcher, Philip. The Army of Robert E. Lee. London, United Kingdom: Arms and Armour Press, 1994. ISBN 1-85409-174-3.
- Trudeau, Noah Andre. The Last Citadel: Petersburg, Virginia June 1864–April 1865. Little, Brown and Company, 1991. ISBN 0-316-85327-5.
