= James Barnes (general) =

American army general (1806–1869)

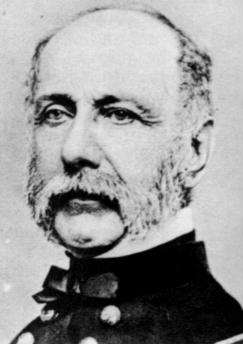
- James Barnes, photo taken during the 1860s
- Born: December 28, 1801; Boston, Massachusetts, U.S.
- Died: February 12, 1869 (aged 67); Springfield, Massachusetts, U.S.
- Burial place: Springfield Cemetery, Springfield, Massachusetts
- Military career
- Allegiance: United States of America; Union
- Branch: United States Army; Union Army
- Service years: 1829–1836, 1861–1866
- Rank: Brigadier General; Brevet Major General
- Commands: 18th Massachusetts Volunteer Infantry
- Conflicts: Black Hawk War; American Civil War; Peninsula campaign; Northern Virginia campaign; Maryland campaign; Battle of Antietam; Battle of Shepherdstown; Battle of Fredericksburg; Battle of Chancellorsville; Gettysburg campaign; Battle of Aldie; Battle of Upperville; Battle of Gettysburg
- Other work: Civil engineering

James Barnes (December 28, 1801 – February 12, 1869) was a railroad executive and a Union Army general in the American Civil War.

== Early life ==
Barnes was born in Boston, Massachusetts. He attended the Boston Latin School and graduated from the United States Military Academy in 1829, ranking fifth out of 46 cadets, in the same class as Robert E. Lee. He was then commissioned a brevet second lieutenant in the 4th U.S. Artillery, but spent most of his army service as an instructor of tactics and French at the academy.

Barnes married Charlotte Adams Sanford in 1832 (sister of John F. A. Sanford). After the birth of his second son, John Sanford Barnes, he resigned his commission on July 31, 1836, to become a railroad civil engineer and by 1839 he was superintendent of the Western Railroad, a job he would hold for 22 years.

== Civil War service ==
On July 26, 1861, Barnes was commissioned a colonel in the 18th Massachusetts Infantry. He and his regiment joined the Army of the Potomac during the Peninsula Campaign, but saw no combat. During the Seven Days Battles, the 18th was assigned to guard duty in the rear, and again Barnes saw no combat. His brigade commander, Brig. Gen. John Martindale, was relieved of command after the Battle of Malvern Hill and Barnes became the new commander of the 1st Brigade, 1st Division, V Corps on July 10, 1862. For reasons unrecorded, Barnes was not present with his brigade at the Second Battle of Bull Run and although the V Corps marched to the Battle of Antietam, it was left in reserve and once again saw no action. However, during Lee's retreat back to Virginia, Barnes saw his first combat when his brigade was attacked by the rearguard of the Confederate Army, resulting in over 200 men shot or drowned in the Potomac River and over 100 more captured.

At the Battle of Fredericksburg in December, Barnes distinguished himself for the first time, leading his brigade in one of the final assaults against Confederate positions on Marye's Heights. His division commander wrote after the battle, "James Barnes ... is entitled to special notice for his coolness, energy, and marked ability." On April 4, 1863, Barnes was promoted to brigadier general, U.S. Volunteers, with date of rank established as November 29, 1862. At the Battle of Chancellorsville in May, Barnes' brigade was not heavily engaged. Late in the battle, his division commander, Brig. Gen. Charles Griffin, fell ill, and Barnes assumed command of the 1st Division on May 5, 1863.

In 1863, Barnes' division camped at Union Mills, Maryland, on its way to Pennsylvania, where the Battle of Gettysburg would turn out to be the most significant action in his career. The new division commander, now 61 years old (older than any other Union general present except Brig. Gen. George S. Greene), arrived early on the morning of the second day, July 2, 1863, with the rest of the V Corps. During the massive Confederate assault on the Union left flank that afternoon, one of Barnes' brigades, under Col. Strong Vincent, was diverted to defend the flank at Little Round Top. The brigade performed magnificently, but Barnes had essentially nothing to do with its actions or the decision to send it there.

Barnes did get personally involved with his other two brigades, who were sent to reinforce the Union line in the Wheatfield, and here his career took a fatal downward turn. He was criticized after the battle for withdrawing his two brigades under Colonels Jacob B. Sweitzer and William S. Tilton 300 yards back from the Wheatfield without permission, despite protests from the generals on his flanks. When reinforcements from the II Corps arrived, Maj. Gen. David B. Birney gave orders for Barnes' men to lie down while the brigade of Brig. Gen. Samuel K. Zook marched over them. Sweitzer's brigade was sent into the Wheatfield, where it was attacked in the flank by another Confederate charge led by Brig. Gen. William T. Wofford. Aides could not find Barnes in the vicinity of his troops. Later that day, Barnes was wounded in the leg, and although it healed, he would never return to combat duty.

After recovering from his wound, Barnes spent the remainder of the war on garrison duty in Virginia and Maryland. This included commanding the District of St. Mary's, Maryland, which contained the prisoner-of-war camp at Point Lookout, Maryland, in the Middle Department. He was mustered out of the volunteer service on January 15, 1866. On January 13, 1866, President Andrew Johnson nominated and on March 12, 1866, the U.S. Senate confirmed the award to Brigadier General Barnes of the honorary grade of brevet major general, U.S. Volunteers, to rank from March 13, 1865.

== Postbellum career ==
After the war, Barnes returned to his profession of railroad civil engineering and was a member of the government commission that supervised the building of the Union Pacific Railroad. Barnes died in Springfield, Massachusetts, and is buried there in Springfield Cemetery|.

== See also ==
- List of American Civil War generals (Union)
- List of Massachusetts generals in the American Civil War
- 18th Regiment Massachusetts Volunteer Infantry
- Massachusetts in the American Civil War
