= Battle of the Weldon Railroad =

The Battle of the Weldon Railroad refers to two actions in Virginia during the American Civil War:

- The Battle of Jerusalem Plank Road, also known as the First Battle of the Weldon Railroad
- The Battle of Globe Tavern, also known as the Second Battle of the Weldon Railroad
