= Battle of Shepherdstown =

Battle of the American Civil War

Coordinates: 39.4279°N 77.7786°W

- Part of the American Civil War
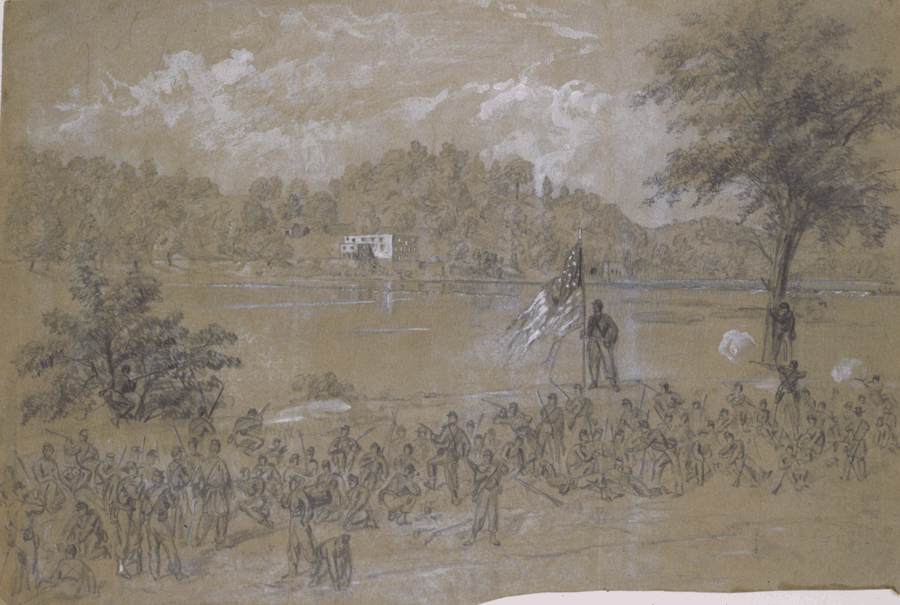
- Ford near Shepherdstown, on the Potomac. Pickets firing across the river. Alfred R. Waud, artist, Sept. 1862.
Date	September 19–20, 1862
Location	Jefferson County, West Virginia
Result	Confederate victory

Belligerents
United States	(Confederate States of America) Confederate States

Commanders and leaders
Fitz John Porter	Stonewall Jackson; William N. Pendleton; A. P. Hill

Units involved
V Corps	Artillery Reserve; A. P. Hill's Light Division

Strength
2,000 infantry (Sept. 19) three brigades (Sept. 20)	600 infantry, ~44 cannons (Sept. 19); 2,000 infantry (Sept. 20)

Casualties and losses
363+	298+

The Battle of Shepherdstown, also known as the Battle of Boteler's Ford, took place September 19–20, 1862, at Boteler's Ford along the Potomac River, during the Maryland campaign of the American Civil War. After the Battle of Antietam on September 17, General Robert E. Lee and the Confederate Army of Northern Virginia withdrew across the Potomac. Lee left a rearguard commanded by Brigadier General William N. Pendleton at Boteler's Ford. On September 19, elements of the Union V Corps dueled with Pendleton's artillery before pushing a short distance across the river at dusk. Pendleton inaccurately informed Lee that all of the artillery of the rearguard had been captured. On the morning of September 20, the Confederates counterattacked with A. P. Hill's Light Division, forcing the Union units back across the Potomac. One Union unit, the 118th Pennsylvania Infantry Regiment, did not withdraw at the same time as the others and suffered heavy losses. Lee's army continued its retreat into the Shenandoah Valley after the battle.

== Background ==
In June 1862, during the American Civil War, General Robert E. Lee took command of the Confederate Army of Northern Virginia after the wounding of General Joseph E. Johnston at the Battle of Seven Pines. Lee's army faced the Union Army of the Potomac, which was led by Major General George B. McClellan. In the Seven Days Battles, Lee's army drove McClellan and the Army of the Potomac back from its position close to the Confederate capital of Richmond, Virginia. Lee then faced a Union advance by Major General John Pope's Army of Virginia, coming from a different direction. Lee's army defeated Pope at the Second Battle of Manassas in late August. Despite having suffered heavy casualties in the previous two campaigns, Lee led his army on an invasion of the Union, striking into the state of Maryland. McClellan replaced Pope as commander of the Union forces, and took the Army of the Potomac north after Lee. Some of McClellan's soldiers discovered Lee's military orders, revealing the Confederate plans on McClellan. On September 14, McClellan forced Lee's army back from the passes on South Mountain; and both armies gathered around Sharpsburg, Maryland, where McClellan attacked on September 17.

In the resulting Battle of Antietam, Lee's outnumbered army repulsed Union assaults throughout the day. Nearly 23,000 men were killed, wounded, or became missing in action during the fighting, making Antietam the bloodiest day in American history. While almost all of Lee's army had been heavily engaged, about a third of the Union forces had not entered the action. Lee's army remained in position on September 18, and McClellan did not order an assault, despite having a significant number of fresh troops. That night, the Confederates began their retreat, aiming for Martinsburg, Virginia. After crossing the Potomac River, Lee left his artillery chief, Brigadier General William N. Pendleton, to hold a rear guard at Boteler's Ford. Pendleton, a former clergyman, had a questionable military reputation and was unpopular with his men. He also had no prior experience commanding infantry. In addition to Boteler's Ford, Pendleton also had to cover another ford to the south and Shepherd's Ford to the north. A small cavalry force was available to cover the southern ford, and Pendleton dispatched an artillery battery and a small infantry force to Shepherd's Ford. Preservationist Frances E. Kennedy states that Pendleton had two brigades and 45 cannon available, while historian Peter S. Carmichael states that he had only 600 men (some of whom were unarmed) and about forty cannons to work with. Historian Shelby Foote gives a cannon count of 44.

== Battle ==
=== September 19 ===
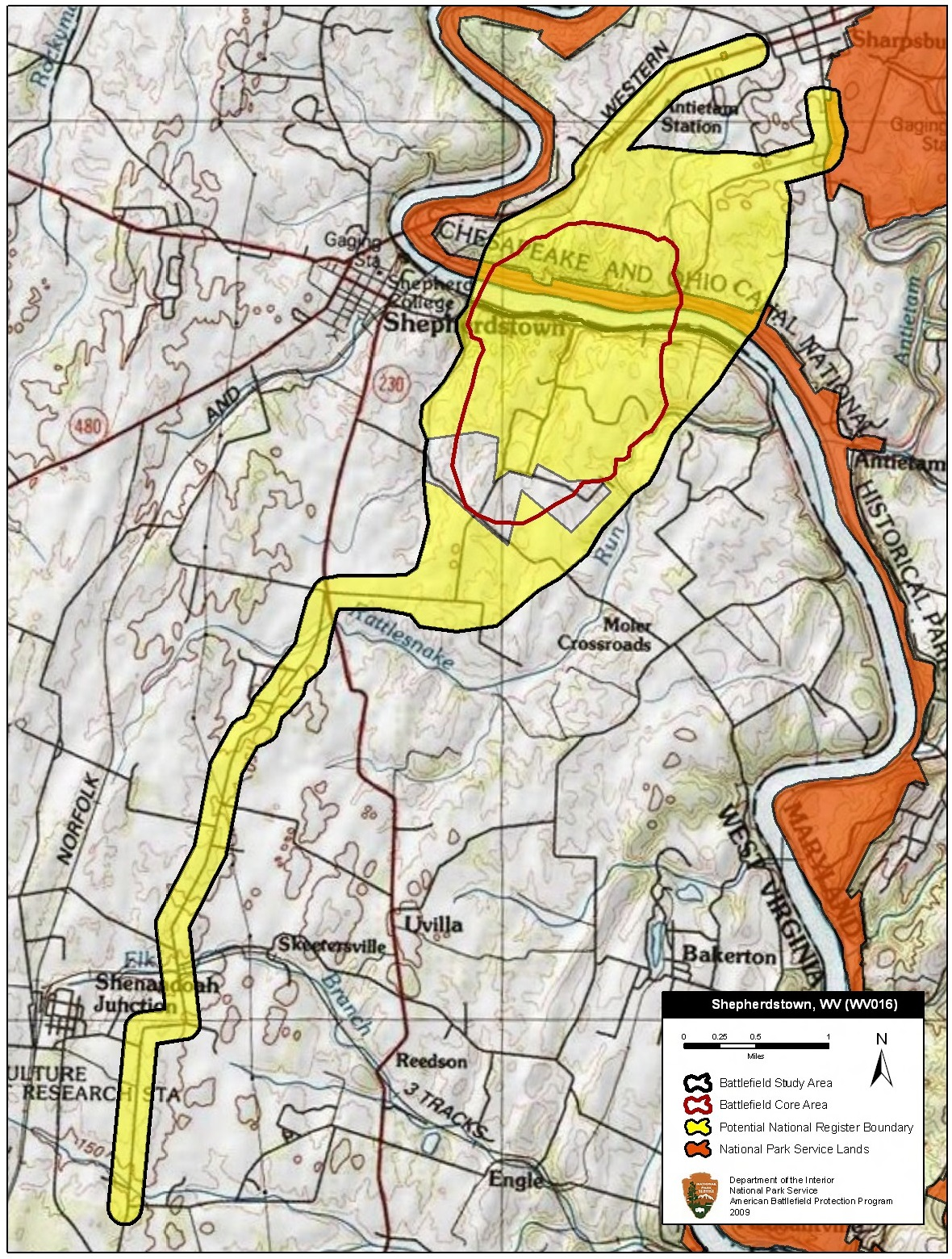
Map of Shepherdstown Battlefield core and study areas by the American Battlefield Protection Program.

Pendleton had excellent terrain to defend at Boteler's Ford: the Virginia side of the Potomac had high cliffs that would be difficult to assault. He placed his 600 men, from the brigades of Alexander R. Lawton and Lewis A. Armistead (led by replacement officers as both Lawton and Armistead had been wounded at Antietam), at the ford itself, while aligning 33 cannons in positions covering the ford. Shorter-range cannons were placed close to the river, while longer-range guns were positioned further back. Advantageous positions for 11 cannons could not be found, so Pendleton did not deploy them. The Confederates may have also had a small reserve. Lee's orders for Pendleton presented two scenarios: if Union activities against Boteler's Ford were limited to artillery firing, Pendleton was to withdraw on the morning of September 20, but if a major Union attack was made, Pendleton was to fall back on the evening of September 19.

On the morning of September 19, Union cavalry and artillery commanded by Alfred Pleasonton approached Boteler's Ford and began an artillery duel. In the late afternoon, the Union V Corps, commanded by Fitz John Porter, arrived. Porter deployed 15 cannons, which were able to silence the Confederate guns through having longer range and better ammunition. The Union 1st United States Sharpshooters took up positions along the Chesapeake and Ohio Canal and harassed the Confederate gunners with fire, but Armistead and Lawton's men at the ford had been ordered to only fire if the Union made a major attempt at crossing. The order was given to preserve ammunition. Pendleton dispatched 200 of the infantrymen to support some of the batteries, and a further sixty were sent to support the Confederate cavalry at the southern ford, likely without Pendleton's knowledge. The infantry defenses at the ford were soon stripped to just 300 men. Pendleton did not coordinate between his artillery and infantry units, and later claimed a lack of knowledge of how many men he had available.

At dusk, a 60-man raiding party from the 1st United States Sharpshooters crossed the ford under covering fire from the 4th Michigan Infantry Regiment. The raiding party lost four men during the crossing. Lawton and Armistead's men, who were in poor condition and had low morale after suffering heavy losses at Antietam, quickly fled. Pendleton's staff was not present, and in the dark and with essentially no knowledge of what was happening at the ford, Pendleton left the field. Part of Colonel James Barnes's brigade moved across the river as well. While a Union force of about 2,000 men in total only advanced a short distance from the ford before withdrawing with four captured guns and some prisoners, Pendleton's line routed. The Union forces had been delayed by the high cliffs until the Confederate artillery had almost entirely withdrawn. During the retreat, Pendleton met the infantry force of the incompetent Roger A. Pryor, and asked Pryor to advance and rescue his cannons, but Pryor would not. Pendleton eventually found Lee and inaccurately told him that all of his cannons had been taken. Lee spent the night vainly trying to ascertain knowledge about the situation while Pendleton slept. Lee decided to postpone any counterattack until morning. Lawton's command had lost seven men wounded, while Armistead's losses were unknown but light.

=== September 20 ===
On the morning of September 20, Porter sent three brigades across the river. Charles S. Lovell's brigade led the way, followed by Barnes's and Gouverneur K. Warren's. Confederate general Stonewall Jackson decided to attack and drive the Union forces back into Maryland. Selecting A. P. Hill's Light Division, Jackson ordered an assault. A. P. Hill formed the 2,000 men of his division into two lines of three brigades each, and attacked at around 09:00. Having advanced about 1 mile (1.6 km) beyond the river, Lovell's brigade detected the movement, and divisional commander George Sykes was informed, who authorized a withdrawal. A single Union regiment attempted to outflank Dorsey Pender's brigade, but was unsuccessful. Porter ordered a withdrawal, but the commander of the 118th Pennsylvania Infantry Regiment (nicknamed the "Corn Exchange Regiment") refused to withdraw his command, as he believed the orders had not come through the proper chain of command. The withdrawal order had been delivered through a staff officer who had given it to a lieutenant in the 118th. The 118th Pennsylvania was an inexperienced unit that had only been in the army for about three weeks, and it found out that half of the weapons it had been issued were defective. The regiment fought for about 30 minutes before being put to rout.

Fleeing Union troops attempted to cross the river, but came under heavy fire while trying to withdraw. Some were shot while trying to cross a dam, while others drowned in the river. The 118th Pennsylvania suffered additional losses from artillery friendly fire as it tried to withdraw. Union artillery prevented the Confederates from crossing the Potomac, and the fighting was over by mid-morning. A small detachment from Warren's brigade recrossed the river at about 16:00 to retrieve an abandoned cannon. Hill reported after the fighting that his men had killed 3,000 Union soldiers, but the true Union casualties of the fighting were 71 dead, 161 wounded, and 131 missing. The Confederates had 30 men killed and 161 wounded; most of Hill's losses were from artillery fire. The 118th Pennsylvania alone accounted for 269 of the Union losses. Union private Daniel W. Burke was awarded the Medal of Honor in 1892 for his actions at Shepherdstown. The Confederates lost one 10-pounder Parrott rifle from Victor Maurin's Louisiana Battery, one 12-pounder howitzer from John Milledge's Georgia Battery, one 12-pounder howitzer from Marmaduke Johnson's Virginia Battery, and one 6-pounder field gun from Charles T. Huckstep's Virginia Battery.

== Aftermath ==
Pendleton was widely criticized within the Confederate press and within Lee's army after the battle. The Confederate army withdrew into the Shenandoah Valley after the battle, and McClellan did not pursue. Due to his lack of aggression in pursuing the retreating Confederates, McClellan was relieved from command on November 5. The President of the United States, Abraham Lincoln, issued the Emancipation Proclamation after the repulse of the Confederate invasion of Maryland. The Emancipation Proclamation underscored the key role that slavery played in the war, and between it and the fighting at Antietam, Confederate hopes of foreign intervention ended. Antietam had represented a major turning point in the war.

== Preservation ==
The American Battlefield Trust and its partners have saved 743.7 acres of battlefield land at the Shepherdstown Battlefield in 13 transactions from 2004 through 2022. In November 2022, the National Park Service announced that it had awarded a $1.9 million grant through its American Battlefield Protection Program (ABPP) to fund the preservation of 200 acres at the battlefield, including the 121-acre Far Away Farm acquired by the Trust and its partners that same month.
