= 4th Pennsylvania Cavalry Regiment =

Union Army cavalry regiment

- Active: October 1861 – July 1, 1865
- Disbanded: July 1, 1865
- Country: United States
- Allegiance: Union
- Branch: Cavalry
- Size: Regiment
- Engagements: American Civil War: Peninsula Campaign; Battle of Antietam; Gettysburg campaign; Wilderness Campaign; Battle of Trevilian Station; Appomattox Campaign

The 4th Pennsylvania Cavalry Regiment was a cavalry regiment of the Union Army during the American Civil War.

== History ==
The regiment was formed in late 1861, in Philadelphia, Harrisburg, and Pittsburgh for a 3-year service. It was mustered into Federal service at the Soldier's Home near Washington, D.C. By March 1 only six companies were fully mounted, and one partially mounted. See Detailed Service for the regiment's service.

== Detailed Service ==
Taken from Pennsylvania in the Civil War Provost duty at Washington, D.C., till May 10, 1862. (Cos. "A," "B" escort to Gen. Keys December 28, 1861, to February 25, 1862.) Joined McDowell at Fredericksburg May, 1862, and scouting on the Rappahannock till June 14. Moved to the Virginia Peninsula, arriving at White House June 24. Companies "A," "G," "H" and "K" ordered to Yorktown, Va., June 25. Seven days before Richmond June 25-July 1. Meadow Bridge near Mechanicsville June 26. Mechanicsville June 26. Gaines' Mill, Cold Harbor, June 27. Reconnaissance to Bottom's Bridge June 28. Rear guard to Army Potomac June 29. Glendale or Nelson's Farm June 30. Malvern Hill July 1. Reconnaissance to Charles City C. H. July 2–3. At Harrison's Landing till August 16. Reconnaissance from Harrison's Landing July 11 and July 29 (Co. "F"). Rear Guard to Yorktown August 16–18. Duty at Yorktown till August 25. Reached Washington, D.C., September 4. Maryland Campaign September–October. Battles of South Mountain September 14, and Antietam September 16–17. Sharpsburg September 19. Shepherdstown Ford September 19. Kearneysville and Shepherdstown, W. Va., October 15–16 (Detachment). Scout to Smithfield October 16–17 (Detachment). Hedgesville October 20 and 22.

Hillsboro and Lovettsville Road October 21. Bloomfield, Union and Upperville November 2–3. Ashby's Gap November 3. Markham Station November 4. Manassas Gap November 5–6. Jefferson November 7. Little Washington November 8. Duty near Hartwood Church till December. Gaines' Cross Roads November 10. Waterloo November 14. Battle of Fredericksburg December 12–15. Scout to Catlett's Station and Brentsville December 21–23 (Detachment). Expedition to Richard's and Ellis' Fords, Rappahannock River, December 29–30. "Mud March" January 20–24, 1863. Operations at Rappahannock Bridge and Grove Church February 5–7. Hartwood Church February 25. Kelly's Ford March 17 and 29. Chancellorsville Campaign, Stoneman's Raid, April 29-May 8. Passage of Kelly's Ford April 29. Raccoon Ford April 30. Ely's Ford May 2. Stevensburg, Brandy Station and Beverly Ford June 9. Aldie June 17. Middleburg June 18–19. Upperville June 21. Hanover, Pa., June 30. Battle of Gettysburg, Pa., July 1–3. Green Oak July 5. Near Harper's Ferry July 14. Shepherdstown July 15–16. Scouting till September. Corbin's Cross Roads September 1. Advance from the Rappahannock to the Rapidan September 13–17. Culpeper C. H. September 13. Near Culpeper C. H. October 1. Bristoe Campaign October 9–22. James City October 10–11. Near Warrenton October 11. Warrenton or White Sulphur Springs October 12–13. Jeffersonton October 12. Auburn and Bristoe Station October 14. St. Stephen's Church October 14. Advance to line of the Rappahannock November 7–8. Mine Run Campaign November 26-December 2. Brentsville November 26. New Hope Church and Catlett's Station November 27. Brentsville November 29. (Cos. "A," "F" at Bull Run Bridge November, 1863, to January 20, 1864.) Scout to Middleburg January 22–24, 1864 (Detachment). Kilpatrick's Raid on Richmond February 28-May 4. Beaver Dam Station February 29. Brook's Turnpike March 1 (Veterans on furlough March 25-April 25. At Camp Stoneman till May 12, and Joined Army Potomac May 19.) Campaign from the Rapidan to the James May–June, 1864. Sumner's Bridge May 3. Todd's Tavern May 5–8. Sheridan's Raid to James River May 9–24. North Anna River May 9–10. Ground Squirrel Church and Yellow Tavern May 11. Glen Allen Station May 11. Brook Church or Richmond Fortifications May 12. Line of the Pamunkey May 26–28. Haw's Shop May 28. Totopotomoy May 28–31. Cold Harbor May 31-June 1. Sumner's Upper Bridge June 2. Sheridan's Trevillian Raid June 7–24. Elliott's Mills June 8. Trevillian Station June 11–12. White House or St. Peter's Church June 21. Black Creek or Tunstall Station June 21. St. Mary's Church June 24. Siege of Petersburg June, 1864, to April, 1865. Charles' Cross Roads June 29. Warwick Swamp July 12. Demonstration on north side of the James July 27–29. Malvern Hill July 28. Warwick Swamp July 30. Demonstration north of the James at Deep Bottom August 13–20. Gravel Hill August 14. Strawberry Plains August 16–18. White Oak Swamp August 18. Weldon Railroad August 18–21 (Detachment). Dinwiddie Road near Ream's Station August 23. Ream's Station August 25. Reconnaissance to Poplar Springs Church September 13. Reconnaissance toward Dinwiddie C. H. September 15. Belcher's Mills September 17. Ream's Station September 29. Poplar Springs Church September 29-October 2. Arthur's Swamp September 30-October 1. Boydton Plank Road, Hatcher's Run, October 27–28. Reconnaissance to Stony Creek November 7. Stony Creek Station December 1. Hicksford Expedition December 7–12. Bellefield December 8. High Hill December 10. Rowanty Creek February 5, 1865. Dabney's Mills, Hatcher's Run, February 5–7. Appomattox Campaign March 28-April 9. Lewis Farm near Gravelly Run March 29 (Co. "C"). Dinwiddie C. H. March 30–31. White Oak Road March 31 (Co. "C"). Five Forks April 1. Paine's Cross Roads and Amelia Springs April 5. Sailor's Creek April 6. Farmville April 7. Appomattox Court House April 9. Surrender of Lee and his army. Expedition to Danville April 23–29. Expedition after Extra Billy Smith May 20–22. At Lynchburg till June 10. Mustered out July 1, 1865.

== Casualties ==
During its service, the regiment had 98 men killed or mortally wounded with another 260 men die of disease.

== Commanders ==
- Colonel David Campbell – Transferred to the 5th Pennsylvania Cavalry on March 12, 1862.
- Colonel James Childs – Promoted to colonel on March 12, 1862. He was killed at Antietam.
- Colonel James Kerr – Promoted to colonel on September 18, 1862, and resigned on May 17, 1863.
- Colonel George H. Covode – Promoted to colonel on May 28, 1864. He was killed at St. Mary's Church on June 24, 1864.
- Colonel Samuel Young – Promoted to colonel on December 29, 1864. Promoted to brevet brigadier general on April 9, 1865, and was mustered out with the regiment on July 1, 1865.
