= Battle for Caen =

Battle during the Normandy campaign

- Part of Operation Overlord
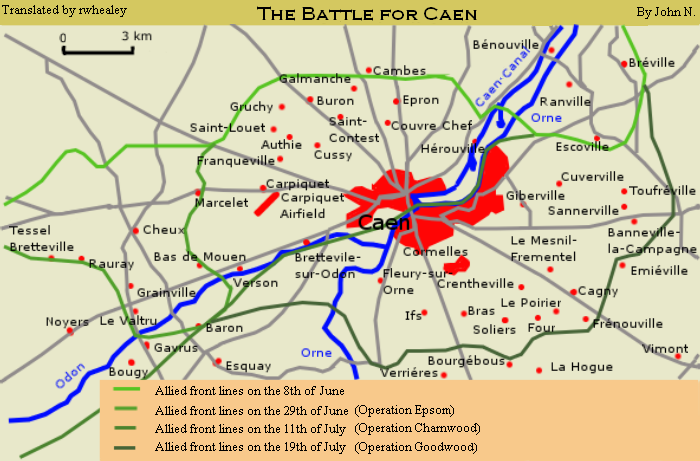
- Battle for Caen
Date	6 June – 6 August 1944
Location	Normandy, France 49°11′10″N 0°21′45″W
Result	Allied victory

Belligerents
United Kingdom; Canada	Germany

Commanders and leaders
Bernard Montgomery; Miles Dempsey; Richard O'Connor; Guy Simonds	Gerd von Rundstedt; Erwin Rommel; Leo Geyr von Schweppenburg; Heinrich Eberbach

Units involved
21st Army Group: Second Army; First Canadian Army	Panzer Group West

Strength
4 armoured divisions; 10 infantry divisions; 1 airborne division; 5 armoured brigades; 3 tank brigades; 2 commando brigades	7 infantry divisions; 8 panzer divisions; 3 heavy panzer battalions; 1 heavy panzerjäger battalion; 2 sturmgeschütz brigades; 3 nebelwerfer brigades

Casualties and losses
c. 50,539 casualties; 450 tanks (253 destroyed)	550 tanks destroyed (Note: Milton Shulman writes: "It is safe to say that at least 550 of the 750 tanks destroyed in Normandy by this date [the end of July] met their fate on the Caen front.")

The Battle for Caen (June to August 1944) was a military engagement between the British Second Army and the German Panzergruppe West in the Second World War for control of the city of Caen and its vicinity during the Battle of Normandy. Caen is about 9 mi (14 km) inland from the Calvados coast astride the Orne River and Caen Canal, at the junction of several roads and railways. The communication links made it an important operational objective for both sides. Caen and the area to its south are flatter and more open when compared to the bocage country of western Normandy, and Allied air force commanders wanted the area captured quickly in order to construct airfields to base more aircraft in France proper.

The British 3rd Infantry Division was to seize Caen on D-Day or alternatively, dig in short of the city. Caen, Bayeux and Carentan were not captured on D-Day, and the Allies concentrated on linking the beachheads. British and Canadian forces captured the area of Caen north of the Orne during Operation Charnwood (8–9 July), while the suburbs south of the river were captured by the II Canadian Corps during Operation Atlantic (18–20 July). The fighting was mutually costly, and greatly deprived the Germans of the means to reinforce the western part of the invasion front.

In the west, the First US Army captured Cherbourg and took Saint-Lô, about 37 mi (60 km) west of Caen, on 19 July. On 25 July the First Army began Operation Cobra, co-ordinated with the Canadian Operation Spring at Verrières (Bourguébus) ridge, south of Caen. Much of Caen had been destroyed, particularly from Allied bombing; many French civilians were killed. After the battle, little of the pre-war city remained and reconstruction lasted until 1962.

== Background ==
=== British strategy ===
Britain had declared war in 1939 to maintain the balance of power in Europe; merely being on the winning side would not be enough to secure British war aims, with the rise of the USSR and the US as superpowers. British post-war influence would be limited but by playing a full part in the overthrow of Germany and the Nazi regime, the 21st Army Group would remain a factor in the post-war settlement, provided that it had not been destroyed in the process; it would also be available for Operation Downfall, the expected campaign against Japan. The British economy had been fully mobilised for war since 1942, when a severe manpower shortage had begun in the army. By avoiding casualties, the effectiveness of the army would be protected, morale among the survivors would be maintained and the army would still be of considerable size once Germany was defeated. At the reopening of the Western Front in 1944, the 21st Army Group would be constrained by a lack of reinforcements, which would also add to the burden of maintaining morale. Many British and Canadian commanders had fought as junior officers on the Western Front in the First World War and believed that an operational approach based on technology and firepower could avoid another long drawn-out bloodbath. (Note: Crerar (First Canadian Army), Dempsey (Second Army). Montgomery's superior, Field Marshal Alan Brooke the Chief of the Imperial General Staff (CIGS and Chair of Chief of Staffs) was a senior artillery officer by 1918.) Great care would have to be taken by the British commanders because the German army in Normandy, with several veteran divisions and many experienced commanders, could be expected to confront mostly novice Anglo-Canadian formations and leaders.

==== Ultra ====
Intelligence gained from reading German wireless messages coded by Enigma cipher machines was codenamed Ultra by the Government Code and Cypher School (GC&CS) at Bletchley Park in England; by mid-1943, Ultra regularly was, unknown to the Germans, being read and passed on to senior Allied commanders. (Note: Before the war, the Biuro Szyfrów (Polish cipher bureau) had invented a method to read Enigma signals and after June 1940, the Polish and French teams came to Britain.) German measures to repel an invasion and the success of Allied deception measures could be gauged by reference to Ultra and other sources of intelligence. In March 1944, decrypts showed that invasions were expected anywhere from Norway to Spain. On 5 March, the Kriegsmarine (German navy) thought that up to six divisions would invade Norway and Fremde Heere West (FHW, Foreign Armies West), the intelligence department of Oberkommando des Heeres (German army high command) that studied the Allied order of battle put the danger zone between the Pas de Calais and the Loire valley. Rundstedt forecast a 20-division invasion in early May, probably between Boulogne and Normandy but identified accurately the concentration area between Southampton and Portsmouth. Anti-invasion practices were conducted from Bruges to the Loire and one scheme assumed an invasion 50 km (31 mi) wide from Ouistreham to Isigny; on 1 June, FHW predicted an invasion on 12 June either on the Mediterranean coast or in the Balkans. (Note: In early February, the lack of reference to Exercise Tiger, a US invasion rehearsal off Slapton Sands which was intercepted by E-boats, was thought to mean that the exercise did not imply an imminent invasion to the Germans.)

==== Overlord plan ====
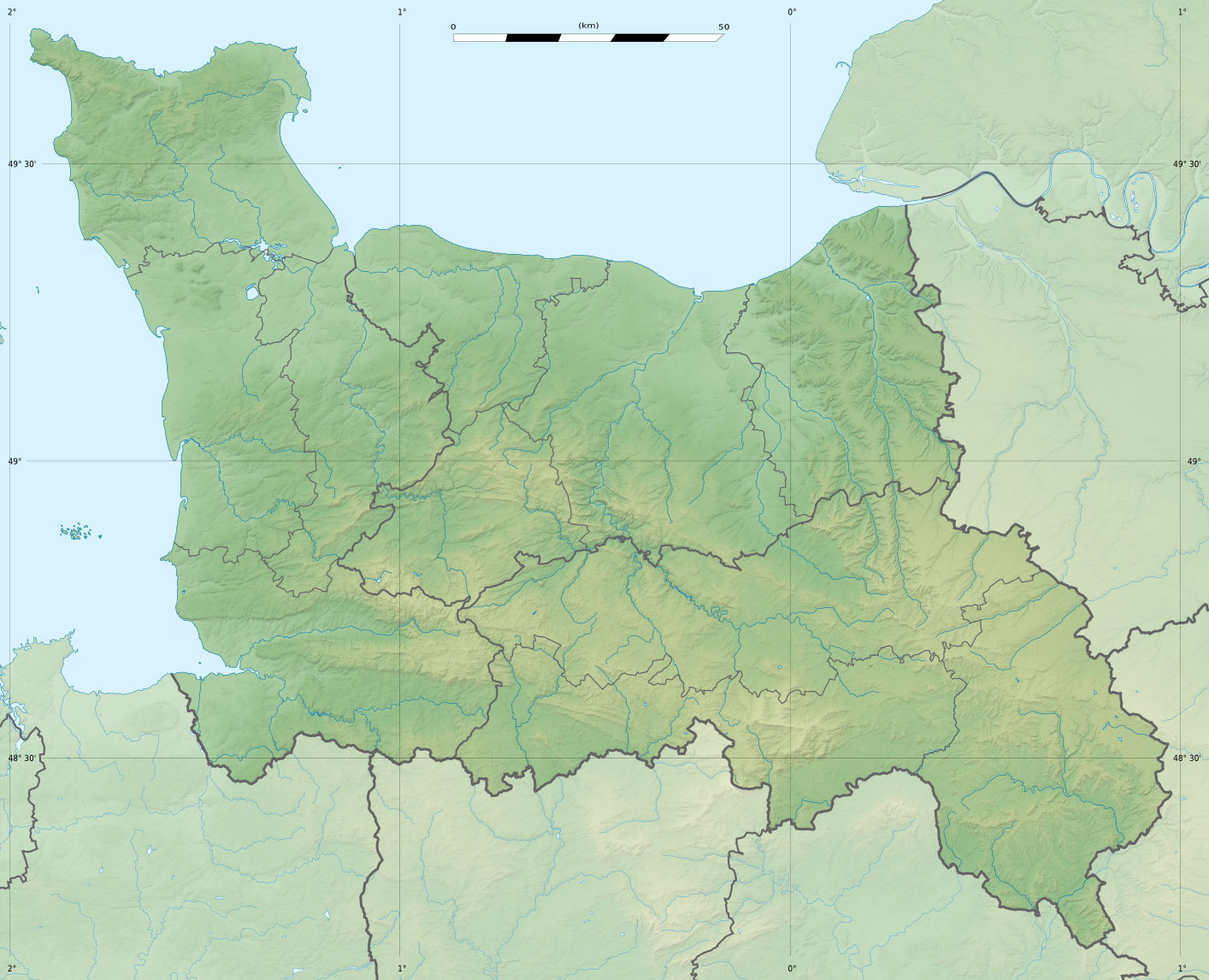
Relief map of Lower Normandy showing main towns and the Overlord invasion front

On 6 December 1943, General Dwight D. Eisenhower was appointed Supreme Allied Commander Allied Expeditionary Force. The invasion was to be conducted by the 21st Army Group (General Bernard Montgomery), which would comprise all Allied troops in France until Eisenhower established his ground forces HQ in France. Lieutenant-General Frederick Morgan, Chief of Staff, Supreme Allied Commander (COSSAC) and his staff had been preparing invasion plans since May 1943. (Note: Three divisions were to land on the Normandy coast on a 30 mi (48 km) front between Vierville-sur-Mer in the west and Lion-sur-Mer at the mouth of the Orne river in the east, with a paratroop descent on Caen to capture the city. The invaders would then advance south and south-east, to gain room for airfields and sufficient depth for a flanking attack on the Cotentin Peninsula. The port of Cherbourg, on the north coast of the Cotentin, was to be captured by D+14.) Montgomery studied the COSSAC plan and at a conference on 21 January 1944, advocated a landing on a wider front between Quinéville in the west and Cabourg les Bains on the east side of the Orne river. Three divisions of the British Second Army (Lieutenant-General Miles Dempsey) were to come ashore on beachheads code-named (from west to east) Gold, Juno and Sword.

Three divisions of the US First Army (General Omar Bradley) were to land on Omaha and Utah in the west and three airborne divisions were to land further inland on the flanks of the invasion area. The US forces in the west were to capture the port of Cherbourg and then in a second phase, the lodgement was to be expanded in the west to the Loire river and the Brittany ports. (Note: writing in 1948, Eisenhower described the plan as "an enormous left wheel, bringing our front onto the line of the Seine" though not a rigid scheme but "an estimate of what we believed would happen when we once could concentrate the full power... against the enemy we expected to meet in Northwestern France".) The Anglo-Canadian forces on the eastern flank of the lodgement would confront the main German force facing the invasion and reinforcements arriving from the east and south-east. In the tactical plan the invaders were quickly to gain control of the main roads in Normandy by the rapid advance of armoured forces past Caen, Bayeux and Carentan, to capture the high ground to the south-east of Caen, which dominated the hinterland, the main roads which converged on Caen and the crossings of the Odon and Orne rivers.

==== Second Army ====
From 7 to 8 April Montgomery held Operation Thunderclap, a planning exercise in which the intention of the operation was given as simultaneous attacks north of the Carentan Estuary and between the estuary and the Orne, to capture a bridgehead that included airfield sites and the port of Cherbourg. Montgomery forecast a rapid German reinforcement of the Normandy front by D+4, from a Westheer (Western army) total of sixty divisions, ten being panzer or Panzergrenadier divisions, to conduct a counter-offensive against the landing beaches. Montgomery predicted that the German offensive would be defeated and the Germans would have to change to the defensive by D+8 to contain the Allied lodgement. The Second Army, comprising British and Canadian divisions, was to land west of the Orne, protected by an airborne division which was to land east of the river and capture the Orne bridges at Benouville and Ranville. The Anglo-Canadians were to advance south and south-east, to capture ground for airfields and guard the eastern flank of the First Army as it attacked Cherbourg. Montgomery used a map to show phase lines, a planning device inherited from the COSSAC plan, to show a first phase complete by D+20, with the battlefront along a line running from the Channel coast to east of Caen, south-west of the city, south of Vire and south of Avranches to the coast.

On 15 May, Montgomery gave a final presentation of the Overlord plan to the Allied commanders and from his notes, gave the intention of the operation, to assault simultaneously,

(a) Immediately north of the Carentan estuary.
(b) Between the Carentan estuary and the R. Orne with the object of securing, as a base for further operations, a lodgement area which will include airfield sites and the port of Cherbourg....

— Montgomery, 15 May 1944

Montgomery predicted that the Germans would try to defeat the invasion on the beaches and hold Caen, Bayeux and Carentan, with Bayeux at the centre of a German counter-offensive, intended to divide the Allied lodgement. As the German counter-offensive faltered a "roping-off" policy would be substituted to hold the ground dominating the road axes around the Dives river, the high ground from the Orne at Falaise to the Vire river at Saint-Lô and along the high ground west of the Vire.

=== German strategy ===
Field Marshal Erwin Rommel and Rundstedt, Oberbefehlshaber West (OB West, Supreme Commander West) disagreed about the methods necessary to defeat an invasion, which led to argument about the deployment of the panzer divisions, the main part of the reserve kept in the hinterland. Rundstedt intended to keep the mobile forces back until the Allied main effort had been identified. The Allies were to be defeated beyond the invasion beaches and then pushed off the continent. General Leo Geyr von Schweppenburg, commander of Panzergruppe West, a headquarters established in November 1943 to train the armoured forces in the west, agreed with Rundstedt, based on the experience of Allied naval gunfire during counter-attacks against the Anzio beachhead (January–February 1944). Rommel had experienced the loss of Luftwaffe air superiority in North Africa and thought that the generals who had gained their experience on the Eastern Front underestimated the effect of Allied air power. Attacks on the movement of reserve forces towards the invasion area would delay them and they would fail to defeat the invasion; only a prompt counter-attack during the landing phase stood a chance of success and the panzer divisions would need to be much closer to the coast for this tactic. Rundstedt and Geyr viewed the inevitable dispersion of the panzer divisions with dismay and thought that a thin screen of panzer divisions would be destroyed by Allied naval gunfire and air attack.

In April 1944, Hitler imposed a compromise in which the 21st, 2nd and 116th Panzer divisions were subordinated to Heeresgruppe B (Army Group B), the 2nd SS, 9th and 11th Panzer divisions went to Heeresgruppe G (Army Group G, Colonel-General Johannes Blaskowitz) and the 1st SS, 12th SS, 17th SS Panzergrenadier and the Panzer Lehr divisions came under his command through Oberkommando der Wehrmacht (OKW, High Command of the Armed Forces). The compromise forced on the western commanders meant that the central reserve was too small to provide the speed and mass that Rundstedt wanted and too few panzer divisions were near the coast to enable Rommel to defeat the invasion as soon as it began. Rundstedt and Rommel lost control over the divisions taken into OKW reserve, which Rommel considered were necessary for his defensive strategy, and he had to spread the 21st, 2nd and 116th Panzer divisions from the Scheldt to the Loire. In the spring of 1944, when Hitler included Normandy as a second Allied objective, OB West had 60 divisions with about 850,000 troops and ten armoured divisions with 1,552 tanks. Heeresgruppe B had 35 of the divisions to protect a coastline 3,000 mi (4,800 km) long. Half of the infantry divisions were smaller coastal defence or training formations and only about a quarter of the infantry divisions were at full establishment in men and equipment. (The II SS Panzer Corps [SS-Obergruppenführer Paul Hausser] with the 9th SS-Panzer-Division Hohenstaufen and the 10th SS-Panzer-Division Frundsberg had been sent to Poland in April but were recalled on 12 June.)

==== Atlantic Wall ====
Command of the German defences of the Western Front was conducted by Hitler through OKW. Since 1940, work had been done on the fortification of ports; the defeat of the Dieppe Raid of 19 August 1942 for a loss of only 600 casualties, demonstrated the defensive value of fortifications. In March 1942, Hitler issued Directive 40, requiring that an invasion force be defeated before it could land or on the coast; in November 1943, Hitler added Directive 51, for the reinforcement of the defences of Western Europe. Rommel was sent from Italy to inspect the coast defences and then Heeresgruppe B was transferred from Italy to command the 15th Army (General Hans von Salmuth) deployed from Antwerp to the Orne and the 7th Army (General Friedrich Dollmann) from the Orne to the Loire but was limited only to a coastal strip 6 mi (9.7 km) deep. Further south, Heeresgruppe G commanded the 1st Army and the 19th Army on the French Atlantic and the Mediterranean coasts. Command of the forces further inland was retained by Rundstedt but control of the panzer and panzergrenadier divisions was eventually split between OKW and the two army groups, Rundstedt retaining command only of the three divisions in Heeresgruppe G. The civilian workers of Organisation Todt and troops built Perlenschnur (string of pearls) of steel-and-concrete defensive positions with overlapping fields of fire based on Widerstandsnester (resistance nests) formed into Stützpunkte (strong points) and Stützpunktgruppen (strong point groups). Beach obstacles and anti-tank ditches were built and vast numbers of real and dummy mines were laid, trebling the number planted since 1941. (Note: Rommel wanted 50–100 million mines but received only 5 million. Defended areas and fortresses (fortified ports) were created and from January to February 1944, the pouring of concrete doubled from 466,900–944,500 yd^{3} (357,000–722,100 m^{3}) per month.) By the end of 1943 about 8,500 fortifications had been built and another 12,247 were added in northern France by 6 June. Artillery positions were moved and false positions dug to mislead Allied air reconnaissance.

==== Normandy coast ====
The Normandy (Calvados) coast has wide beaches, small harbours and is close to the port of Cherbourg. There is an 18 mi (29 km) stretch between the mouth of the Orne north of Caen and Arromanches on which landings can easily be made, except for reefs, which prevent large ships from approaching the shore. In 1944, the 150 mi (240 km) from the Seine to Cherbourg was garrisoned by six German divisions, four being lower establishment coast defence divisions, supported by the 21st Panzer Division (Generalleutnant Edgar Feuchtinger). On Sword, 522 hedgehogs, 267 stakes, 76 wooden ramps and 46 Cointet-elements were installed by June, making one obstacle every 3 yd (2.7 m), built from 245 long tons (249 t) of steel, 124 long tons (126 t) of wood and a mass of concrete; most of the obstacles were fitted with mines or anti-aircraft shells, making about 1 lb (0.45 kg) of explosives per 1 yd (0.91 m) of beach. Beachfront properties were fortified and Stüzpunktgruppen built at Franceville and Riva Bella at the mouth of the Orne, an artillery battery was emplaced at Merville with four 75 mm guns in steel and concrete emplacements and a battery of 155 mm guns installed south of Ouistreham. On 8 mi (13 km) of the shore from Riva Bella to a Stüzpunkt at Corseulles, nine resistance nests (WN, Widerstandsnester) were built along the seawall and in the dunes. Most of the WN had a concrete emplacement, proof against bombing and heavy artillery bombardment and a gun sited to fire in enfilade along the beachfront. The nests also had machine-gun posts, mortar positions and big concrete bunkers to protect the garrisons.

There was no continuous second position but field guns and anti-tank guns were dug in 2–4 mi (3.2–6.4 km) behind the coast and infantry reserves were billeted in villages, to contain a breakthrough until mobile reserves arrived. The 716th Infantry Division (Generalleutnant Wilhelm Richter), a two-regiment division increased to about 9,343 men in early 1944, supported by Artillery Regiment 1716 with five artillery batteries of French and Russian guns and an anti-tank company. By early 1944, the division garrisoned the German defences from Le Hamel to Merville-Franceville-Plage in four sectors, where 13,400 mines had been laid (about half were neutralised by corrosion in the detonators). A few weeks before the invasion, the division had 7,771 men in Grenadier regiments 726 and 736 with three battalions each, with 96 machine-guns, eleven 50 mm mortars, thirteen 80 mm mortars and with a poorly trained Ostbattaillon mainly of Poles, a second anti-tank company and several anti-aircraft batteries. The 21st Panzer Division was transferred to Caen in May, deploying its 146 tanks and 50 assault guns south of the city, two panzergrenadier battalions on either side of the Orne north of the city, and its artillery on the coast to provide more defensive depth to the 716th Infantry Division on its 8 mi (13 km) front.

== Prelude ==
=== I Corps plan ===
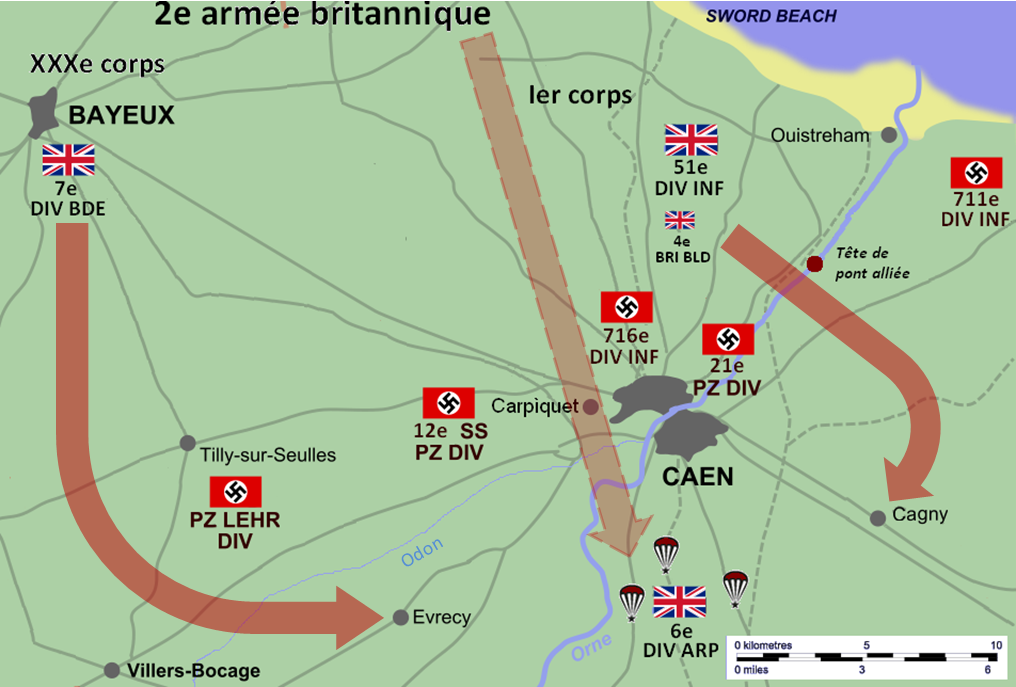
Diagram of the Wild Oats contingency plan

Before dawn on D-Day, the 6th Airborne Division, with the 1st Canadian Parachute Battalion attached, was to conduct Operation Tonga. The division was to capture of the Caen canal and Orne river bridges over the lower Orne by coup de main, establish a bridgehead on the east side of the river and block a possible German counter-attack. I Corps (Lieutenant-General John Crocker) was to land with the 3rd Canadian Infantry Division (Major-General Rod Keller) to the west on Juno with the 2nd Canadian Armoured Brigade and advance south to cut the Caen–Bayeux road as far as Carpiquet, north-west of Caen. The 3rd Infantry Division (Major-General Tom Rennie) and the 27th Armoured Brigade were to land on Sword and advance directly on Caen. If Caen was captured at the first attempt, I Corps would take the high ground to the south on the Falaise road; if the German defenders thwarted the attempt, the corps was to consolidate a defensive front around the city. In case Caen was not captured on D-Day, Operation Smock had been planned to commence once the 51st (Highland) Division and the 4th Armoured Brigade had landed and reinforced the attackers about 3 to 4 days later. Operation Wild Oats was another plan made before the invasion, for XXX Corps and the 1st Airborne Division to cut off a possible German retirement westwards from Caen. The landings were to be supported by the bombardment of the inland defences by Allied strategic bombers, naval bombardment ships and the beaches to be "drenched" by rocket and field gun fire from landing craft.

== Battle ==
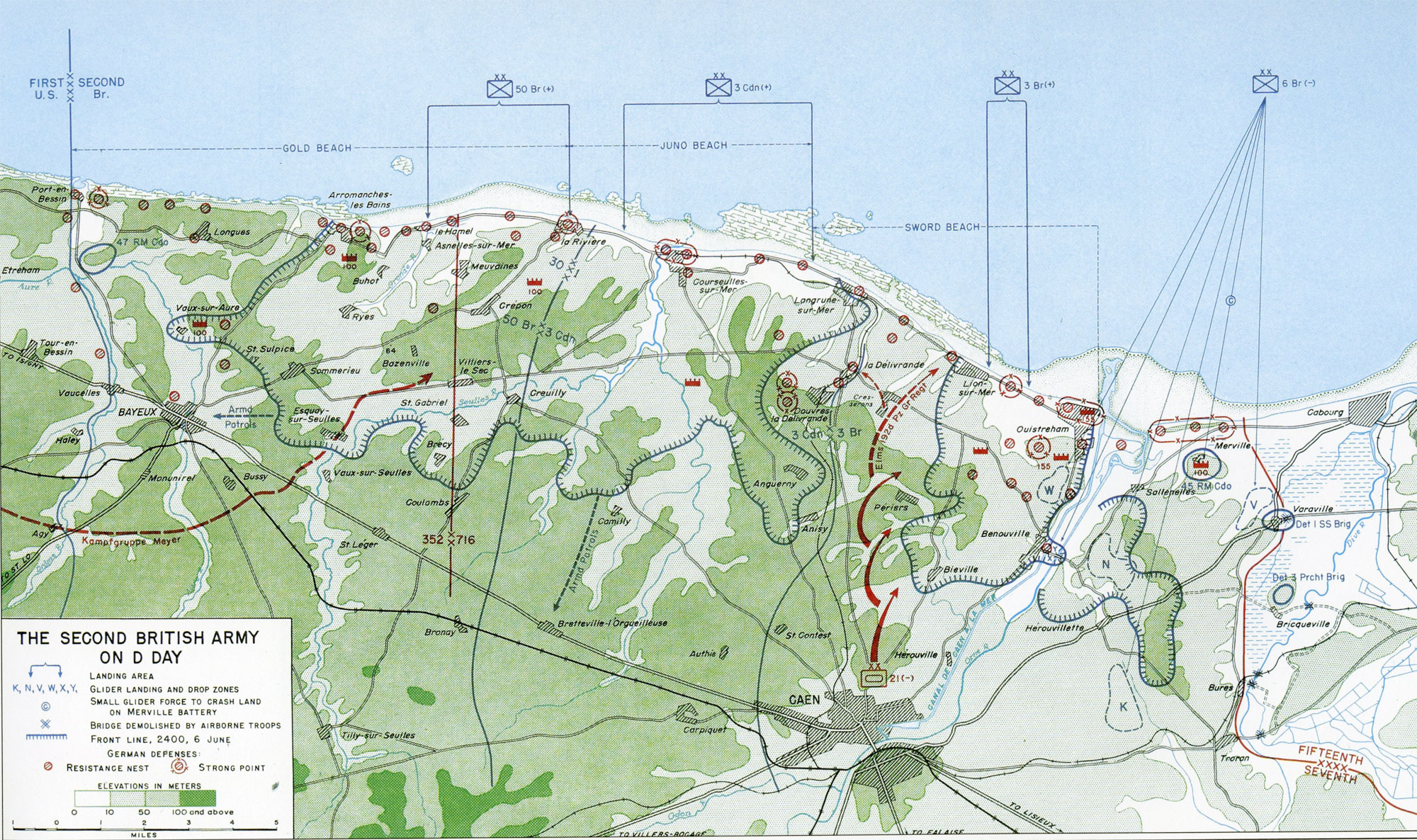
D-Day landing beaches and German counter-attacks, 6 June 1944

=== D-Day, 6 June ===
The naval bombardment and bombing by the Allied air forces failed to have the destructive effect on German beach defences hoped for, and in many places Allied infantry, engineers and tanks had to fight their way forward. The 3rd Canadian Infantry Division landed on Juno with the 7th Canadian Infantry Brigade to capture Corseulles, but this took until the afternoon. The 8th Canadian Infantry Brigade attack on Bernières and St Aubin sur Mer met determined German resistance, and the 9th Canadian Infantry Brigade followed on as the tide rose higher and faster than usual, which narrowed the beach, making traffic jams at the beach exits much worse. On the left of the Canadians, the 8th Infantry Brigade came ashore on Sword with the 1st Special Service Brigade on its left (northern) flank, to join the 6th Airborne Division at the Orne crossings.

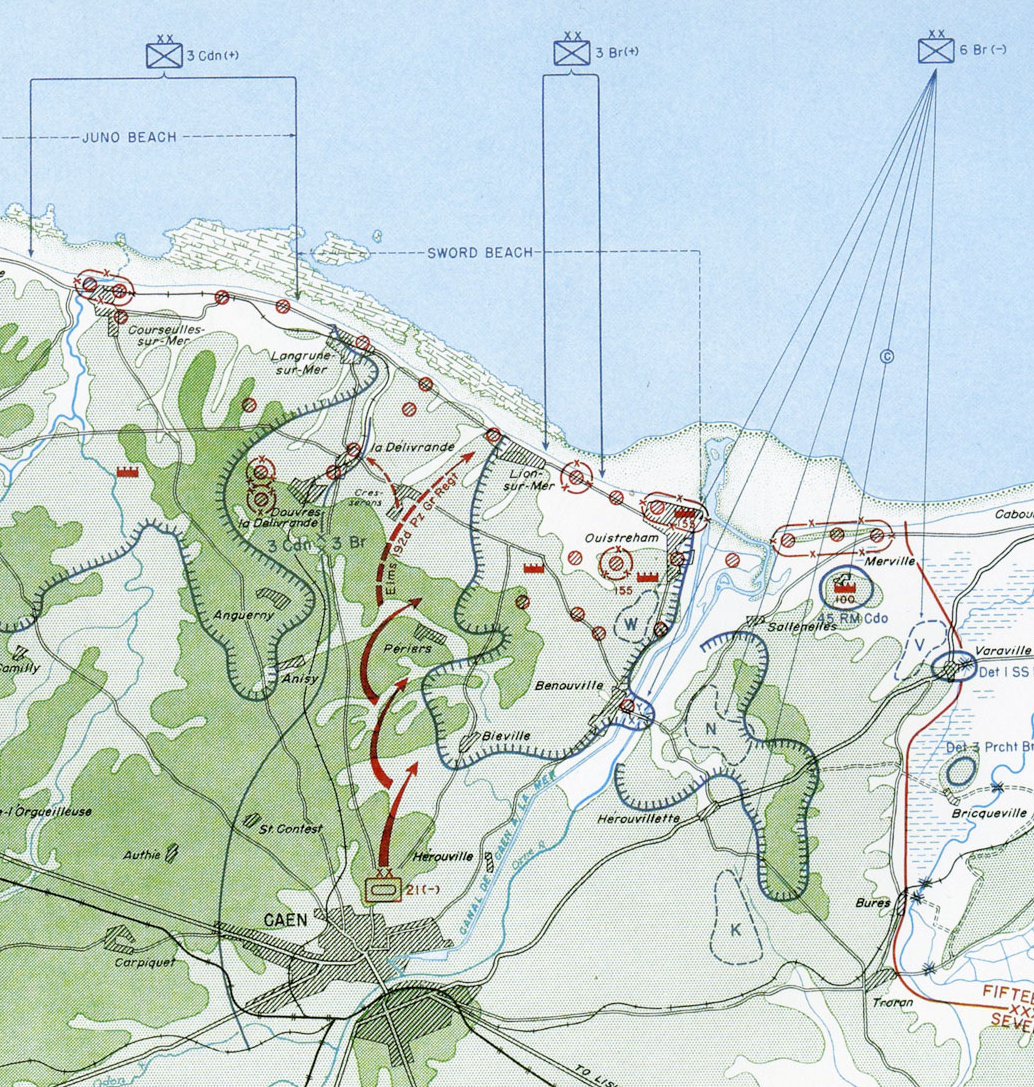
I Corps landings at Juno and Sword, German defences and 21st Panzer Division counter-attack, 6 June 1944

The unsettled weather that lulled the German commanders also pushed the tide in quicker and further than expected, which covered obstacles and reduced the beaches to a strip about 11 yd (10 m) from the water's edge to the sea wall, delaying the landing of follow-on forces; Sword was reduced to only 15 yd (14 m) instead of the usual 150 yd (140 m) of beach. Fire from un-suppressed German machine-gun nests swept the beach as the British advanced to capture the beachfront resorts and villas. A German strongpoint at La Brèche held out until about 10:00 a.m. but by 10:30 a.m. the British and Canadian divisions had landed fifteen infantry battalions, five Commando units, seven armoured regiments, two Royal Marine armoured support regiments, nine field artillery regiments and two engineer regiments, on a beachhead only 5 mi (8.0 km) wide. By noon the follow-up brigades were ashore and had inched through traffic jams at the beach exits under severe bombardment from German artillery, to begin the advance inland.

The German response was slower than the Allies expected, because the decision to land on 6 June had caught the German commanders unprepared. By morning, reports received by the German 15th Army HQ led to the highest level of alert (Alert 2) being ordered, but not at the 7th Army HQ, except for possible terrorist attacks. Many senior officers were absent, and only when it was discovered that parachutists were landing was an alert called by the 7th Army; German troops went off on wild goose chases and found dummy paratroops. At 6:00 a.m., Rundstedt asked for control of the I SS Panzer Corps to counter an invasion, but it took ten hours to be granted. The German tactical reply was resolute and troops on the Calvados coast fought with determination in many places. The 3rd Infantry Division had made swift progress from Sword against the 716th Division at Hermanville, Ouistreham and Colleville but was delayed further inland at strongpoints Daimler, Hillman, Morris and Rover. Hillman dominated the road south towards Caen and had been so cleverly fortified and camouflaged, that its size and layout was a surprise. Morris surrendered at 1:00 p.m. but Hillman held out until the next morning and absorbed some of the forces intended for the dash to Caen, while other troops and tanks were still stuck in traffic at the beach exits. The fight for Hillman delayed the advance of the 8th and 185th Infantry Brigades and gave time for the infantry of the 21st Panzer Division to stop its counter-attacks against the 6th Airborne Division on either side of the Orne, to concentrate on the west side against the 3rd Infantry Division, despite being spotted and attacked from the air.

=== Operation Perch (10–14 June) ===
Allied and Axis dispositions on 12 June 1944

Operation Perch was intended to create the threat of a British break-out to the south-east of Caen by XXX Corps, with the 50th (Northumbrian) Infantry Division capturing the road to Tilly-sur-Seulles. The 7th Armoured Division would then spearhead the advance to Mont Pinçon. On 9 June, Montgomery ordered that Caen be taken by a pincer movement. The eastern arm of the attack would consist of I Corps with the 51st (Highland) Infantry Division, which was to cross into the Orne bridgehead and attack southwards to Cagny, 6 mi (9.7 km) south-east of Caen. XXX Corps would form the western arm of the pincer; the 7th Armoured Division would advance to the south-east and cross the Odon River, to capture Évrecy and Hill 112. XXX Corps attacked Tilly-sur-Seulles against the Panzer Lehr Division and part of the 12th SS Panzer Division, which held Tilly despite many casualties on both sides.

I Corps was delayed moving into position because the state of the Channel slowed the arrival of follow-up divisions and its attack was delayed until 12 June. The 51st Highland Division attacked the 21st Panzer Division but its defence was determined, and on 13 June the offensive east of Caen was called off. On the right flank of XXX Corps, the 352nd Infantry Division had been defeated by the 50th Northumbrian Division and the 1st US Division and its remnants forced to flee southwards, leaving a 7.5 mi (12.1 km) gap in the German front. Dempsey ordered the 7th Armoured Division to exploit the opening, seize Villers-Bocage and advance into the western flank of the Panzer Lehr Division. After the Battle of Villers-Bocage, the position was judged untenable and 7th Armoured Division withdrew on 14 June. The division was reinforced by the 33rd Armoured Brigade, another follow-up formation, ready to resume the attack but on 19 June, a severe storm descended upon the English Channel, damaging the Mulberry harbours and worsening the delay in unloading of reinforcements and supplies.

=== Operation Epsom (26–30 June) ===
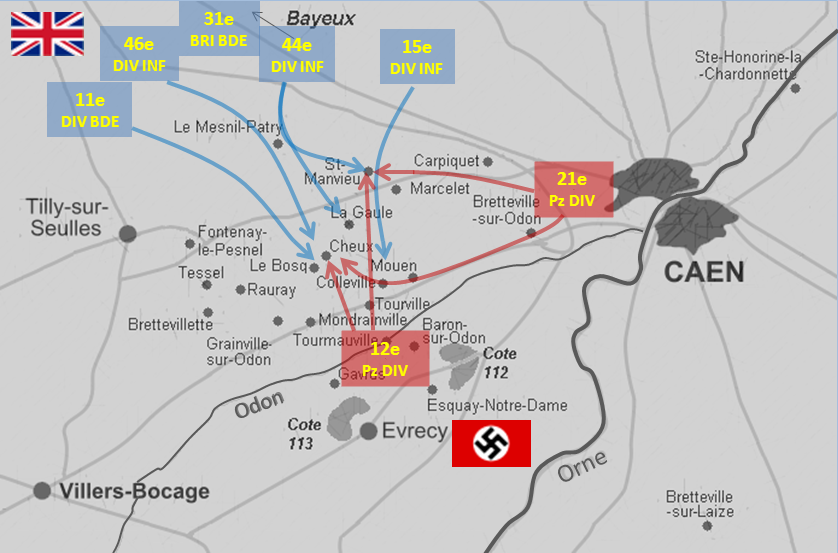
Operation Epsom, 26 June

On 25 June, XXX Corps (49th (West Riding) Infantry Division, 50th (Northumbrian) Infantry Division and the 8th Armoured Brigade) launched Operation Martlet. The attack, a preliminary to the Second Army's main effort Operation Epsom, intended to take Rauray village and spur, Fontenay-le-Pesnel, Tessel-Bretteville, and Juvigny. Opposing the British, were the 3rd Battalion, 26th SS Panzer Grenadier Regiment and part of the 12th SS Panzer Regiment of the 12th SS Panzer Division on and around the spur; both had been depleted by the fighting in the preceding weeks but were well dug-in. By the end of the day, the British had reached the woods near Vendes and a line roughly south of Fontenay-le-Pesnel; the Germans had held Rauray, and about half the spur. The next day, Tessel-Bretteville was captured by the British and lost to a subsequent counter-attack. During the night, reinforcements reached the Panzer Lehr Division, on the right flank near Vendes. On 27 June, the British took Tessel-Bretteville wood and Rauray, but the fighting on the Rauray Spur continued during Operation Epsom. (Note: Early on 28 June, the 70th Brigade attacked towards Brettevillette, but counter-attacks by part of Kampfgruppe Weidinger delayed the British advance until the II SS Panzer Corps arrived, retook Brettevillete and formed a new defensive line around Rauray. From 29 to 30 June, the 49th (West Riding) Infantry Division consolidated the area around Rauray, as the main counter-attack by II SS Panzer Corps against Operation Epsom took place further south. On 1 July, Kampfgruppe Weidinger attacked Rauray frontally at 6:00 a.m. The 11th Durham Light Infantry and the 1st Tyneside Scottish eventually repulsed the attack, and at 10:00 a.m. the Germans withdrew. At 11:00 a.m., Kampfgruppe Weidinger attacked again, but failed to breach the British line. An attack around noon by the 9th SS Panzer Division to the south made little progress and by 6:00 p.m. the Germans withdrew, leaving about thirty knocked-out armoured vehicles behind.)

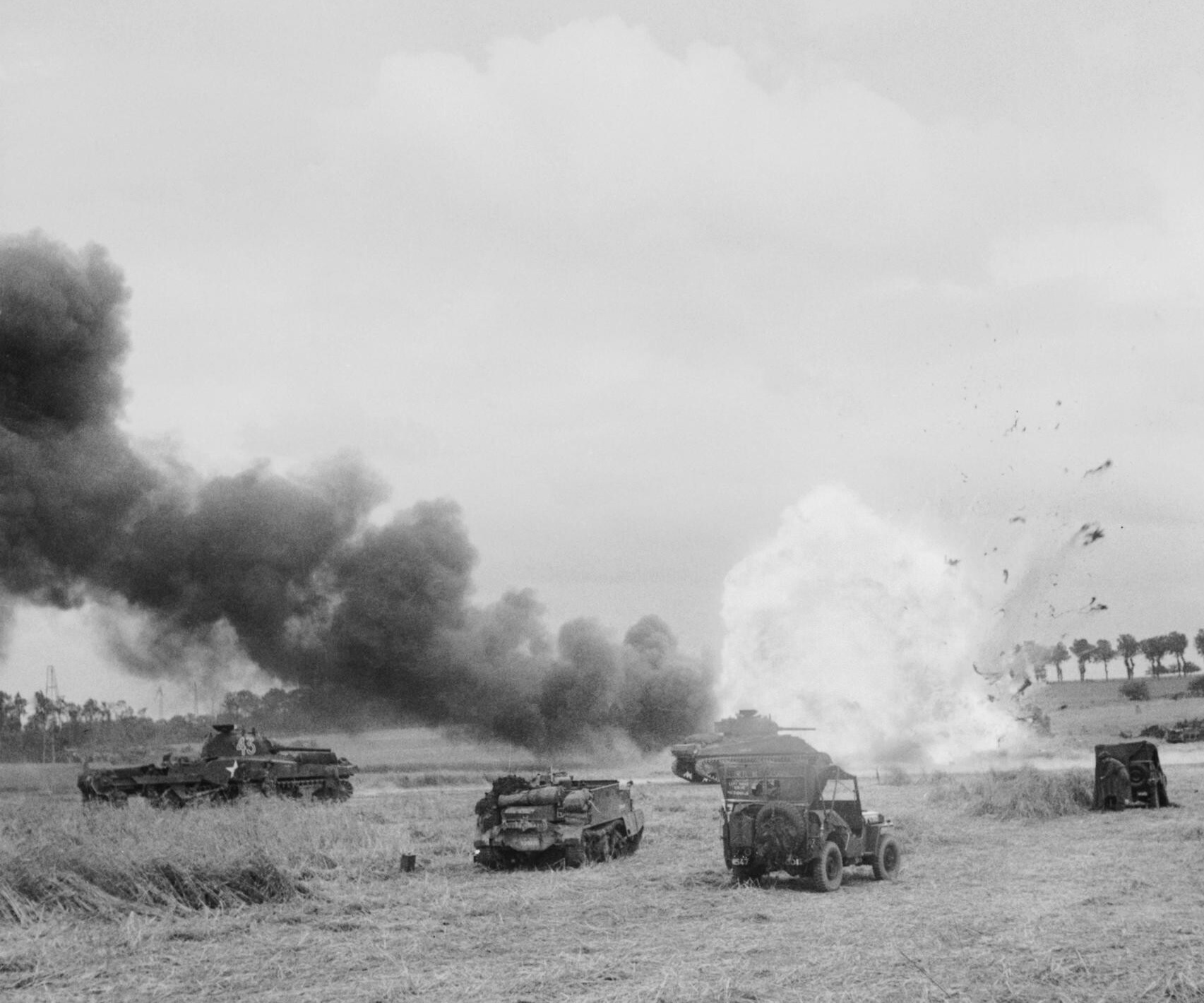
An lorry carrying ammunition explodes after being hit by a mortar round during Operation Epsom on 26 June 1944.

Operation Epsom began on 26 June, to capture the high ground south of Caen, near Bretteville-sur-Laize with the newly arrived VIII Corps. The operation was supported by 736 guns, the Royal Navy, close air support and a preliminary bombardment by 250 RAF heavy bombers. (The bombing for the start of the operation was called off due to poor weather over Britain.) I and XXX Corps were also to support Epsom, but delays in landing equipment and reinforcements led to their role being reduced. The 15th (Scottish) Infantry Division and the 31st Tank Brigade made steady progress, and by the end of the first day had overrun much of the German outpost line with the exception of some locations along the flanks. Over the following two days, a foothold was secured across the River Odon and efforts were made to expand this, by capturing tactically valuable points around the salient and moving up the 43rd (Wessex) Infantry Division. German counter-attacks, by the I SS Panzer Corps and II SS Panzer Corps, led to a withdrawal from some of the British positions across the river by 30 June.

VIII Corps had advanced nearly 6 mi (9.7 km). With their last reserves, the Germans achieved a costly defensive success by containing the British offensive. A German counter-offensive by fresh forces against the Allied beachhead had been forestalled and no German armoured forces could be redeployed against the US First Army or moved into reserve. From 26 to 30 June, the operation cost the Second Army up to 4,078 casualties. VIII Corps suffered 470 men killed, 2,187 wounded and 706 men missing. During 1 July, a further 488 men were killed and wounded and 227 were reported missing. The German Army lost over 3,000 men and 126 tanks.

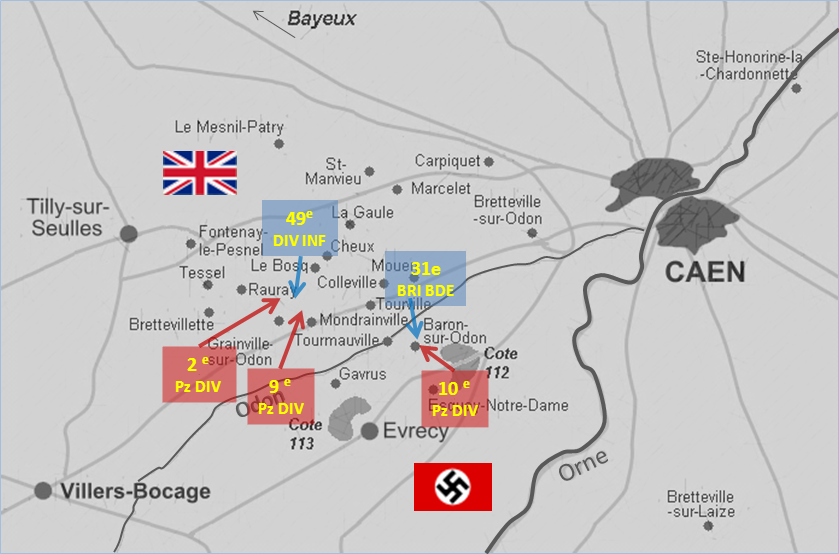
Operation Epsom, 1 July

The airfield at Carpiquet near Caen had been a D-Day objective for the 3rd Canadian Infantry Division but the 12th SS Panzer Division arrived first and occupied the concrete shelters, machine gun towers, tunnels, 75 mm (2.95 in) anti-tank guns and 20mm anti-aircraft guns around the airfield, behind mine fields and barbed wire entanglements. A Canadian operation during Operation Epsom had been postponed because of the delays in disembarking troops. For Operation Windsor, the 8th Canadian Infantry Brigade was reinforced. The Canadians took Carpiquet village with the help of the French Resistance on 5 July and three days later, after repulsing several German counter-attacks, captured the airfield and adjacent villages during Operation Charnwood. Keller was severely criticised for not using two brigades for Operation Windsor and for delegating detailed planning to Brigadier Blackader of the 8th Brigade.

=== Operation Charnwood (8–11 July) ===
Map of Caen and the aiming points of the heavy bombers

Three infantry divisions and three armoured brigades of I Corps were to attack southwards through Caen to the Orne river and capture bridgeheads in the districts of Caen south of the river. An armoured column was prepared to advance through the city to rush the bridges to exploit the victory and sweep on through southern Caen toward the Verrières and Bourguébus ridges, opening the way for the Second Army to advance toward Falaise. New tactics were tried, including a preparatory bombardment by Allied strategic bombers to assist the Anglo-Canadian advance and to prevent German reinforcements from reaching the battle or retreating. Suppression of the German defences was a secondary consideration; close support aircraft and 656 guns supported the attack.

On the evening of 7 July, bombers dropped over 2,000 short tons (1,800 t) of bombs on the city. Cautious planning to avoid attacking their own troops meant the bombs landed more on the city than German defences. (Note: RAF Bomber Command records are for 467 aircraft, including Pathfinders, dropping 2,276 long tons (2,313 t) of bombs. In the RAF official history volume III, The Fight is Won (1954) H. St G. Saunders recorded 2,363 long tons (2,401 t) from 457 bombers and in Montgomery's Scientists.... (2000), Terry Copp wrote that the first aiming point, on the northern edge of Caen, was attacked by 300 bombers and the second, in open country, by 160 aircraft. Each bomber carried 5 long tons (5.1 t) of 500 and 1,000 lb (230 and 450 kg) bombs with .025-second delay fuzes. The ORS2 report concluded that the effect of the bombing was small because the areas bombed had few troops in them but those that were present would have been "seriously disorganised". Luftwaffe Field Regiment 31 was cut off from its supplies but held out for longer, which was thought to be because the unit was prevented from retiring by the bomb damage. The commanders of the 9th Canadian and 9th British brigades was that the bombing on the northern outskirts of Caen made it harder to capture.) The ground attack began at 4:30 a.m. on 8 July supported by a creeping barrage. By evening, the I Corps had reached the outskirts of Caen and the Germans began to withdraw their heavy weapons and the remnants of the 16th Luftwaffe Field Division to the southern side of Caen. The remnants of the 12th SS Panzer Division fought a rearguard action and then retired over the Orne.

Mountains of rubble, [approximately] 20 or 30 feet [≈ 6 or 9 metres] high [...] the dead lay everywhere.

— Arthur Wilkes describing the situation following the operation.

The 12th SS Panzer Division withdrew during the night; early on 9 July, British and Canadian patrols entered the city and Canadians occupied Carpiquet airfield. The 3rd Infantry Division made swift progress and by noon had reached the north bank of the Orne, inflicting severe casualties on the 16th Luftwaffe Field Division. Soon afterwards they meet the 3rd Canadian Infantry Division in the town centre. Some bridges were left intact but were blocked by rubble and covered by German troops on the south bank poised for a counter-attack. Following the battle "In the houses that were still standing there slowly came life, as the French civilians realized that we had taken the city. They came running out of their houses with glasses and bottles of wine."

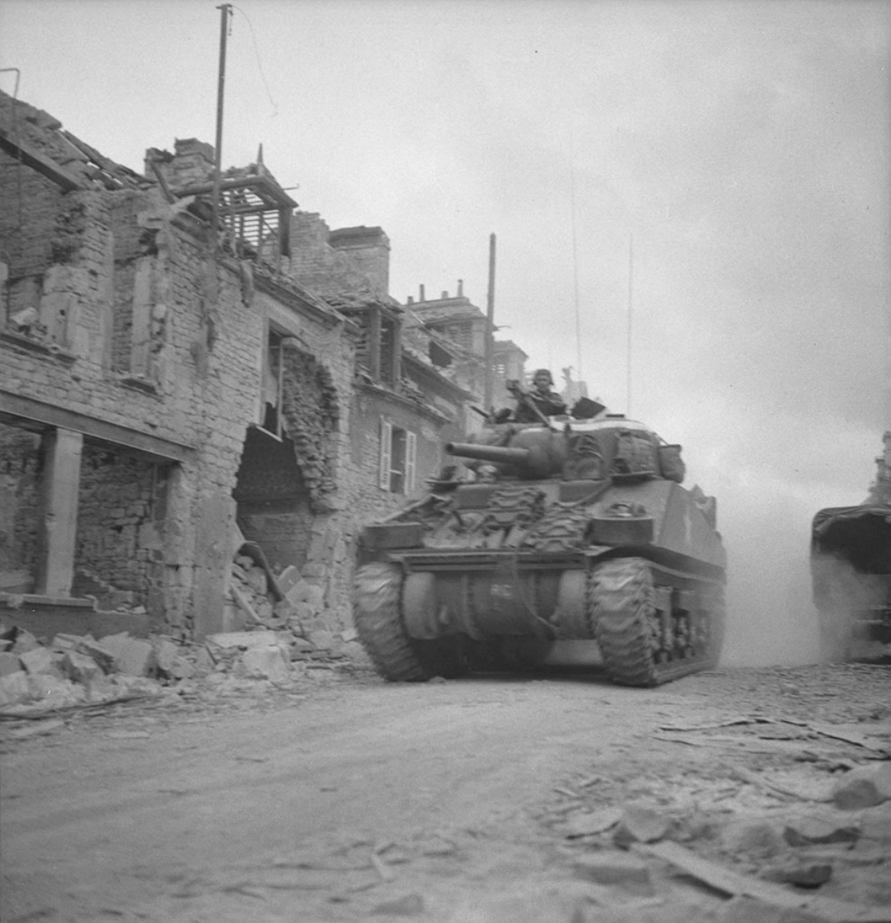
M4 Sherman of the Canadian Army drives through Caen, 10 July 1944

Operation Jupiter, a VIII Corps attack by the 43rd (Wessex) Infantry Division and the 4th Armoured Brigade began on 10 July, to follow up a possible German retreat after Charnwood. The Germans had five infantry battalions, two Tiger detachments, two Sturmgeschütz companies and Nebelwerfer, most from the 10th SS-Panzer Division, with elements of the 9th SS-Panzer Division and the 12th SS-Panzer Division Hitlerjugend in reserve. The attack was intended to capture the villages of Baron-sur-Odon, Fontaine-Étoupefour, Château de Fontaine and recapture the top of Hill 112 by 9:00 a.m. After the first phase, positions on Hill 112 were to cover an advance on Éterville, Maltot and the ground up to the River Orne. A bombardment of mortars and over 100 field guns was to precede the attack.

The attack began after a naval bombardment, air attack and artillery-fire but the Tiger tanks of the schwere SS-Panzer Abteilung 102 (Heavy SS Tank Detachment 102) out-ranged British Churchill and Sherman tanks. Neither side could hold Hill 112, the top of which was left in no-man's-land. Several villages nearby were taken and the 9th SS-Panzer Division was sent from reserve to contain the attack, that achieved the Allied operational objective. (Note: In August the Germans withdrew from Hill 112 and the 53rd (Welsh) Division occupied the feature almost unopposed. British casualties during the period were c. 25,000 troops and c. 500 tanks. The 43rd Infantry Division suffered 7,000 casualties from 10 to 22 July.)

=== Operation Goodwood ===
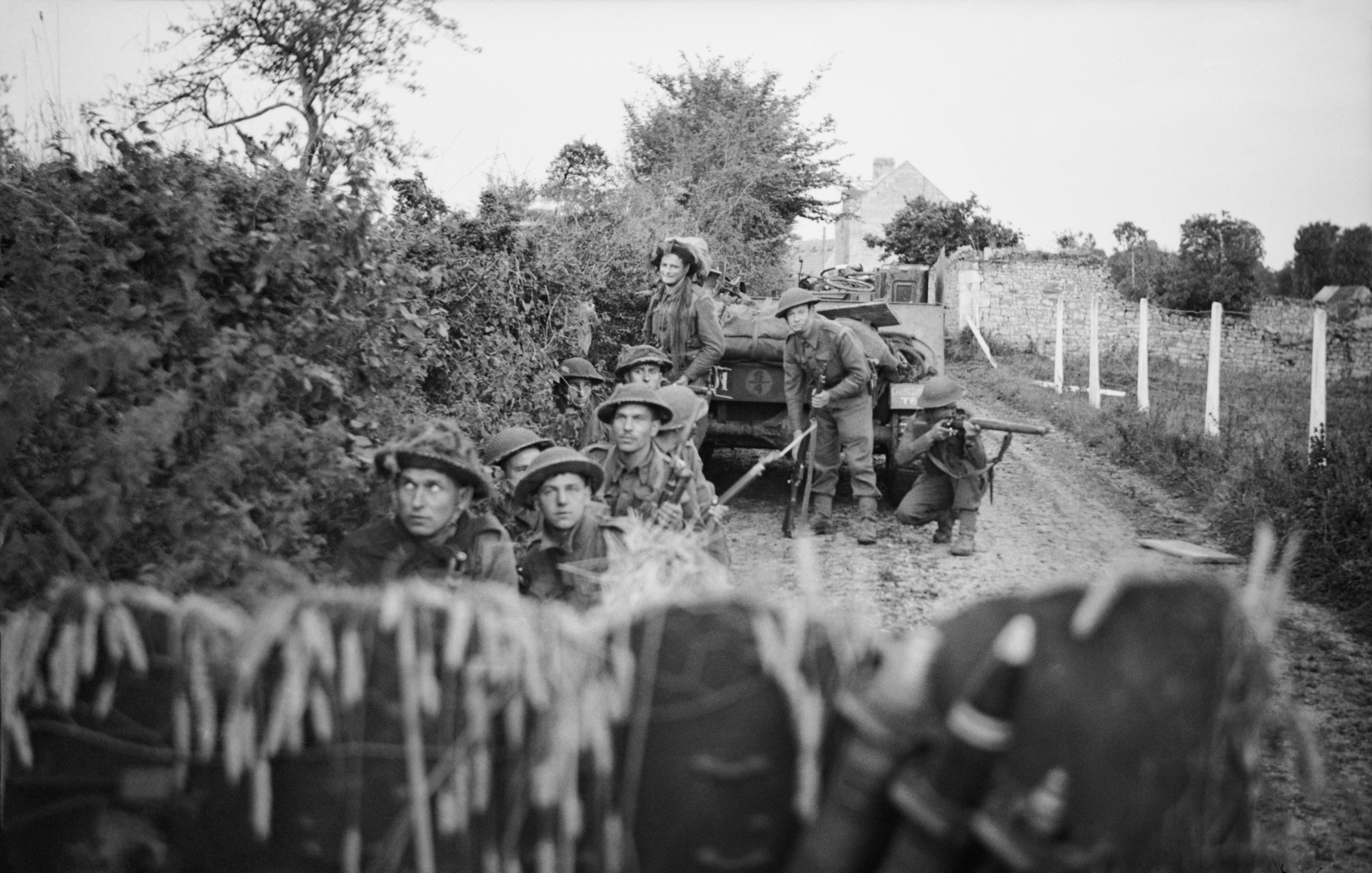
Soldiers of the 43rd Wessex Division seek shelter from German mortar bombardments, 10 July.

On 18 July, VIII Corps began Operation Goodwood, an attack by three armoured divisions towards the German-held Bourguébus Ridge, along with the area between Bretteville-sur-Laize and Vimont, to force the Germans to commit their armoured reserves in costly counter-attacks. Goodwood was preceded further west by the Second Battle of the Odon, attacks by XXX Corps and XII Corps, to inflict casualties and concentrate the attention of Panzergruppe West on the east end of the bridgehead. On 18 July, I Corps conducted an advance to secure villages and the eastern flank of VIII Corps. On the western flank, II Canadian Corps conducted Operation Atlantic to capture the remaining German positions in Caen south of the Orne. The Germans were able to stop the British advance short of Bourguébus Ridge but had been shocked by the weight of the attack and preliminary aerial bombardment. The Germans had only the resources to hold ground in great depth south of Caen. The south bank suburbs had been captured by the Canadians in Operation Atlantic and the British had advanced 7 mi (11 km) east of Caen and took about 12,000 yd (11,000 m) of ground to the south of the city.

The attack reinforced the German view that the Allied threat on the eastern flank was the most dangerous and more units were transferred eastwards, including the remaining mobile elements of the 2nd Panzer Division near Caumont. Blumenson wrote that the British force suffered over 4,000 casualties and almost 500 tank losses, about 36 percent of the British tanks in France. Buckley wrote in 2004 that "Goodwood was a flawed plan, poorly executed and with little chance of success", that the Goodwood plan "demonstrated a poor understanding of the employment of armour in terms of manoeuvring space" and that "the tactical considerations for British armour in Goodwood were considerable and quite alarming". Buckley wrote in 2014 that in Goodwood and Atlantic the Anglo-Canadians had 5,500 casualties and about 400 tanks knocked out, but that the German armoured units remained pinned down around Caen as planned. By 25 July, there were 600 panzers (including all the Tiger units) opposite the Second Army and 150 facing the US First Army. The Germans had not been destroyed but the German commanders became fatalistic.

=== Operation Atlantic ===
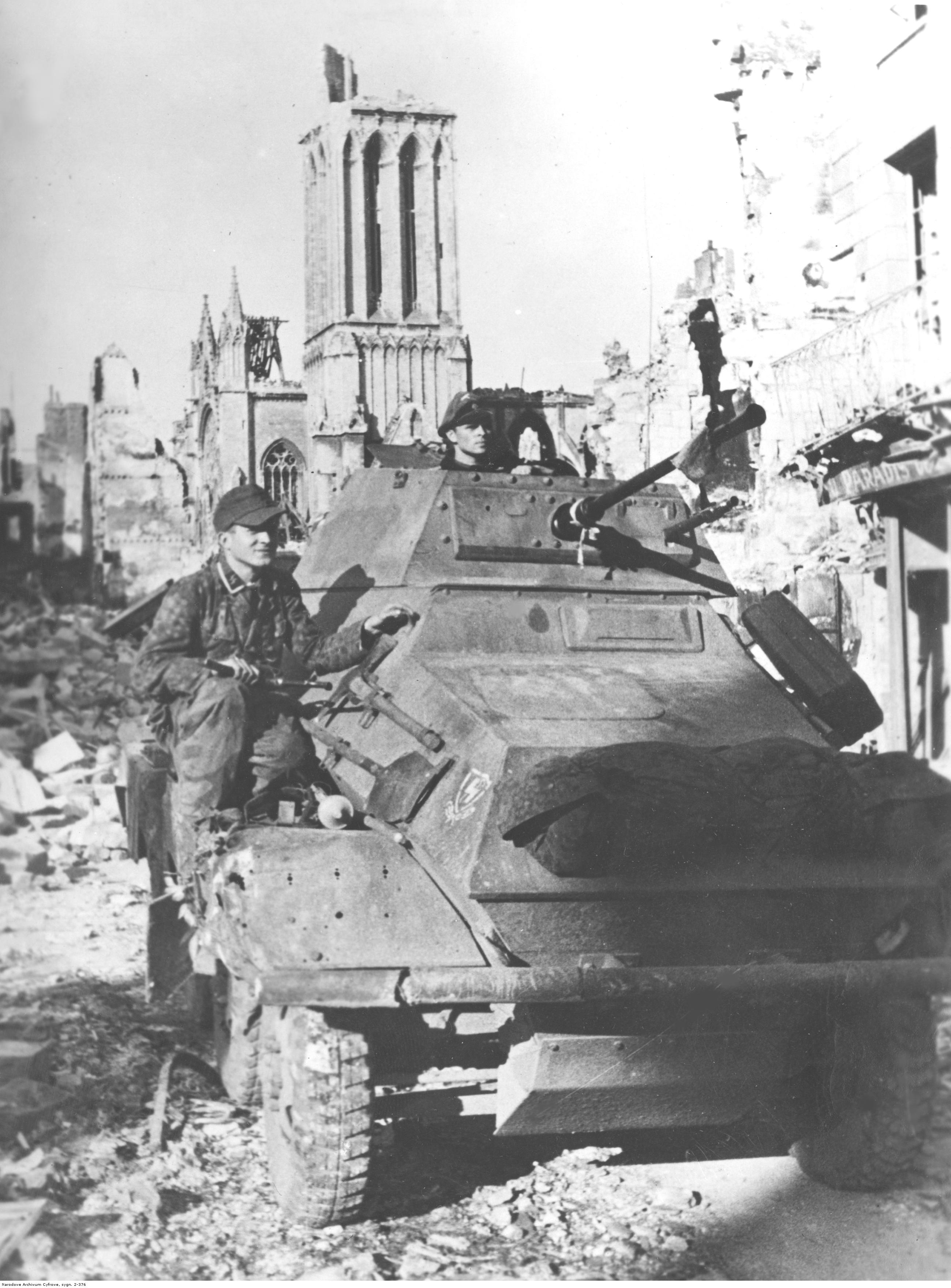
A German Sd. Kfz. 231 (8-rad) heavy reconnaissance vehicle of the 12th SS Panzer Division Hitlerjugend navigates the ruins of Caen in July, 1944. The heavily damaged Church of Saint-Pierre is visible in the background.

During the battle, the I SS Panzer Corps had turned the 90 ft (27 m) high Verrières Ridge into their primary fortification, defending it with hundreds of guns, tanks, Nebelwerfers, mortars, and infantry from up to three divisions. On 18 July, Operation Atlantic began 45 minutes after Goodwood and the 2nd Canadian Infantry Division with tank support, captured Giberville and the Caen industrial suburbs of Colombelles and Vaucelles south the Orne. By mid-afternoon, two companies of the Black Watch had crossed the river and the 5th Canadian Infantry Brigade managed to push southward to Saint-André-sur-Orne. With the south bank secured, the 4th and 6th Canadian Infantry Brigades moved into position for the second phase, an assault on Verrières Ridge (Bourguébus Ridge to the British). On 19 July, Cormelles was captured with the 7th Armoured Division and the 5th Canadian Brigade took the east slope of Point 67 (the village of Ifs). The 1st SS Panzer Division and the 272nd Infantry Division counter-attacked but were repulsed. On 20 July, The South Saskatchewan Regiment, The Queen's Own Cameron Highlanders of Canada and the 27th Armoured Regiment (The Sherbrooke Fusilier Regiment), supported by Hawker Typhoons, assaulted the ridge. The Cameron Highlanders attacked Saint-André-sur-Orne but were repulsed. Torrential rain immobilised tanks and infantry and grounded aircraft and the South Saskatchewans lost 282 casualties. Battlegroups from four panzer divisions counter-attacked and forced the Canadians back beyond their start lines. The Essex Scottish lost c. 300 casualties. On 21 July, Simonds ordered The Black Watch (Royal Highland Regiment) of Canada and The Calgary Highlanders to stabilise the front along Verrières Ridge. The two battalions and the 3rd Canadian Infantry Division defeated more counter-attacks by the two SS Panzer divisions in costly defensive fighting.

=== Operation Spring ===
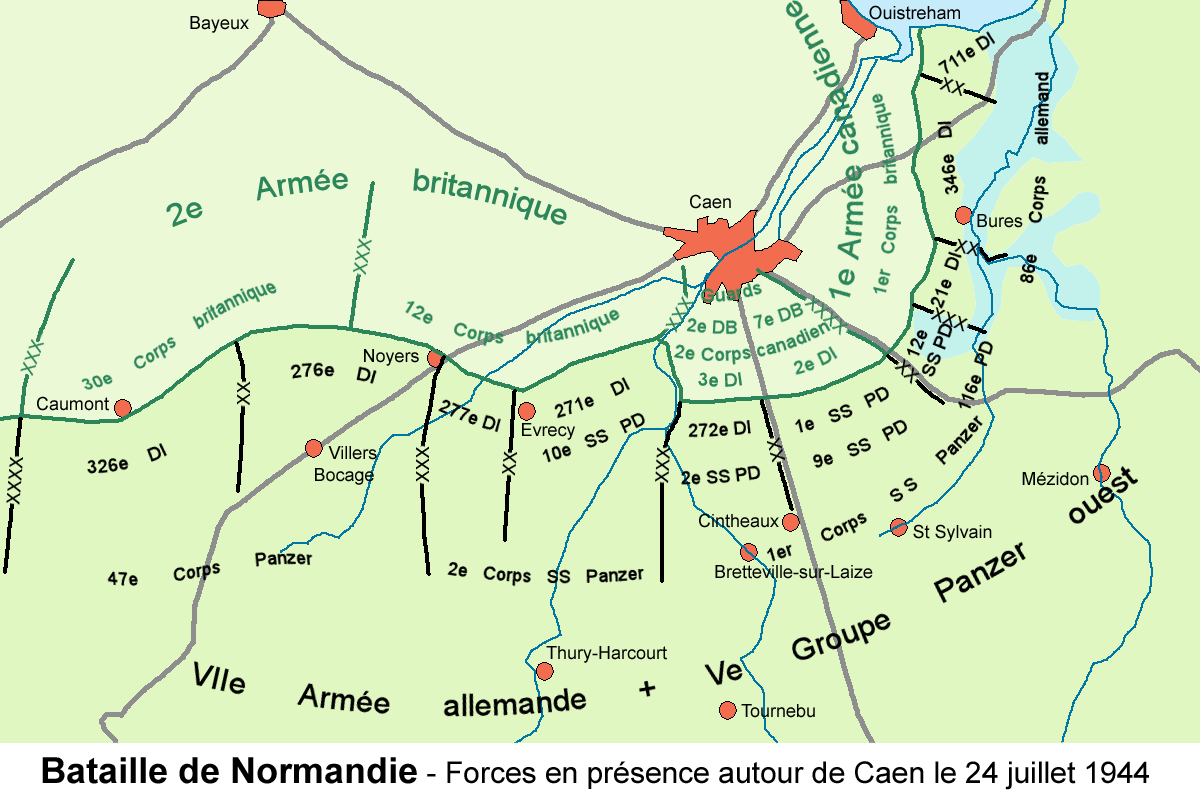
24 July, territory gained in Operations Atlantic and Goodwood and orders of battle

On 25 July, II Canadian Corps conducted Operation Spring on Verrières (Bourguébus) Ridge simultaneously with the American Operation Cobra in the west. The operation was to capture the ridge and villages on the south slope. The German defences on the ridge and armoured counter-attacks inflicted heavy casualties on the Canadian infantry and tanks, and the attack "fizzled out fairly quickly" later in the day.

== Aftermath ==
=== Analysis ===
Terry Copp wrote in 2004, that the 9th Canadian Infantry Brigade had worked through traffic jams and had captured Villons les Buissons, when Dempsey ordered the invasion divisions to dig in on an intermediate objective, as the 21st Panzer Division counter-attack against the 3rd Division. The panzers were repulsed by the 185th Infantry Brigade and then penetrated between Sword and Juno; the attack cost the Germans 33 percent of their tanks. The German panzer force was still formidable when it was ordered to retire, as another Allied aerial armada appeared overhead; both sides had been given orders which were cautious and events possibly made them premature. Copp called the Allied achievement "extraordinary" but one which failed to impress writers like Chester Wilmot and Charles Stacey, the Canadian official historian. Copp wrote that the Anglo-Canadians had advanced inland by bounds from one secured objective to the next, according to their training, a cautious but sensible tactic. The stop order has been criticised on the assumption that the 9th Canadian Infantry Brigade would not have been overrun on the final objectives, something which happened to some Canadian units the next day. Had the Germans waited to prepare a proper co-ordinated counter-attack, instead of conducting piecemeal attacks on 6 June, it could have been a greater threat but it was impossible to know the effect of hypothetical decisions.

In a 2004 academic study, Robert Citino criticised the British on D-Day, at Villers-Bocage, Epsom and Goodwood, for failing to use mobile warfare tactics and in 2009, Antony Beevor wrote that the British had not been sufficiently ruthless. Buckley wrote that these critics concentrated on British failings; only a few hours after the landings began on 6 June, the British army was "supposedly fluffing its lines"; in 1962 the historian Alexander McKee described the D-Day rush on Caen degenerating into a "plodding advance by a few hundred riflemen", a failure which condemned the British to costly battles of attrition. Buckley wrote that critics had it that the British "bungled matters again" at Villers Bocage a week after D-Day, when the 7th Armoured Division was "stopped dead in its tracks, apparently by the action of a single Tiger tank". For the next few weeks, despite plentiful resources, the British attacks on Caen "seemingly made little headway", while the US First Army captured Cherbourg and the Cotentin Peninsula. After the capture of the Cotentin, the Americans pushed south and were poised for Operation Cobra by 25 July. The British Operation Goodwood, which had taken place east of Caen the week before, was written off as a "humiliating failure", with 400 tanks knocked out. When the Germans were finally driven from Normandy, the British "seemingly made a hash of the pursuit" by not trapping German forces west of Antwerp.

Buckley wrote that criticism of the performance of the British army came to a head in the 1980s and was reflected in popular films, television programmes, board and computer games. The view of the British army as "triumphant and successful" had been replaced by one of an "unimaginative force which only prevailed...through sheer weight of resources and...outmoded attritional methods". Artillery was the main infantry-killer of the war and it was Allied, especially British artillery, which was the most feared by the Germans after 1942; British guns dominated the battlefield and prevented concentration and manoeuvre. The British also emphasised support for the infantry and tanks by all arms and provided plenty of equipment and ammunition, while the Germans had to improvise and lurch from crisis to crisis. In Normandy, the Anglo-Canadians had experienced casualty rates similar to those of the Third Battle of Ypres in 1917 and by the end of August, each of the seven British infantry divisions in France had suffered about 75 percent casualties. Riflemen amounted to 15 percent of the army and bore 70 percent of the losses, yet the human cost of the Battle of Normandy, much of which was fought by the Anglo-Canadians against Panzergruppe West for possession of Caen, came within War Office expectations. The Anglo-Canadians played a crucial role in Normandy but managed to avoid a bloodbath like those of the First World War and the Eastern Front from 1941 to 1945.

Army Group B Weekly casualty reports 6 June – 13 August 1944
6 June to	Running total	Replaced
25 Jun	43,070	—
2 July	62,603	—
7 July	80,783	—
16 July	100,089	8,395
23 July	116,863	10,078
27 July	127,247	14,594
6 Aug	148,075	36,371
13 Aug	158,930	40,002

In 2006, Stephen Badsey wrote that the 6th Airborne Division achieved its objectives on 6 June but the scattering of the US airborne divisions on the western flank, led the Germans to believe that the Allied schwerpunkt (point of main effort) was close to the Cotentin Peninsula. Even as Kampfgruppe von Luck was counter-attacking the British paratroops east of the Orne, LXXXIV Corps was sending reinforcements westwards against the Americans. Only when confronted with the advance of the 50th (Northumbrian) Infantry Division inland from Gold, was Kampfgruppe Meyer re-directed towards Bayeux. Badsey wrote that had the kampfgruppe counter-attack succeeded along with those of the 21st Panzer Division, the arrival of the 12th SS Panzer Division on 7 June, might have led to the Second Army being surrounded. Badsey wrote that after D-Day, historians and writers concentrate on the defence of Caen by the 12th SS and the 21st Panzer divisions but that the Germans also conducted many pincer attacks against the invasion beaches which were devastated by Allied air and naval bombardment, which made it impossible to manoeuvre north of the Caen–Cherbourg road, just as Rommel had predicted.

The Germans persisted with counter-attacks after 6 June and Kampfgruppe Meyer and Mobile Brigade 30 were smashed north of Bayeux. The attacks of the 50th (Northumbrian) Infantry Division, combined with those of the 1st US Division on the western flank, destroyed five kampfgruppen of the 352nd Infantry Division, creating the Caumont Gap on 8 June, the remnants breaking out during the night. Despite the danger to Caen, Heeresgruppe B and the 7th Army HQs thought that the main Allied effort was still in the west. On 9 June, German forces from the Orne to the Vire were ordered onto the defensive, to send reinforcements to Cherbourg and the Panzer-Lehr Division was ordered to recapture Isigny-sur-Mer, until the British advances south of Bayeux forced Rommel to divert the division to the east. Badsey wrote that contrary to the scepticism of US staff officers at Montgomery for calling Caen the "key to Cherbourg", Heeresgruppe B planned on 11 June to swap the panzer divisions in the east for infantry divisions and transfer the panzers to the Carentan–Montebourg area, to protect Cherbourg from the First Army. The plan was abandoned because of the risk of an Anglo-Canadian breakout and the directive from Hitler to roll up the beachheads from the east.

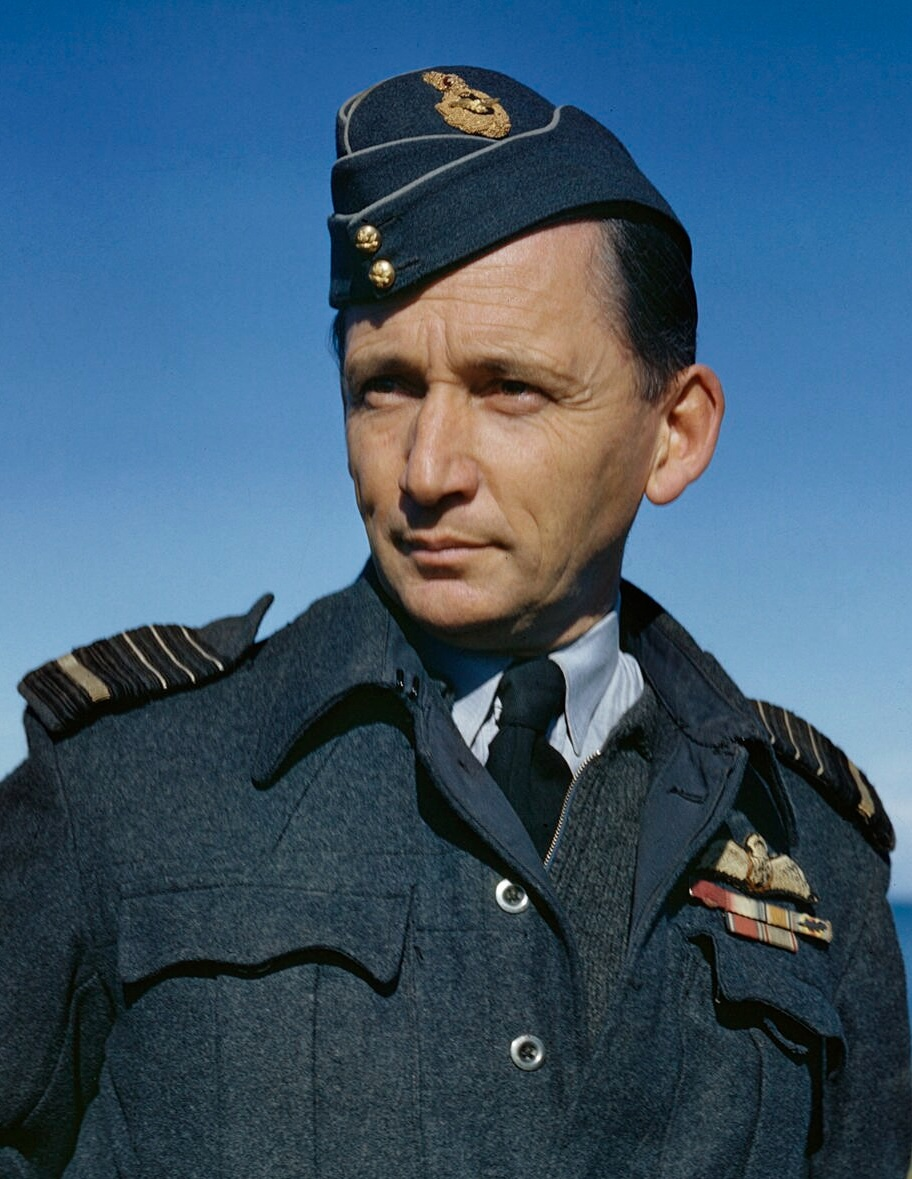
Arthur Tedder (photographed in 1943)

Badsey wrote that the invasion could only have been defeated by a fundamental change in the German defensive scheme, implemented several months before the invasion. By 14 June, the arrival of the 12th SS Panzer Division and the Panzer-Lehr Division opposite the Anglo-Canadians and the reinforcement of the defenders opposite the US troops in the west, created the impression of equality in the number of divisions. Reinforcements enabled the Germans to obstruct the Allied advance inland, prompting Tedder to remark that the situation had the "makings of a dangerous crisis". Badsey described the stalemate as an illusion, because counting divisions was a false comparison, not representative of the massive Allied superiority over the Germans. On 10 June, Allied planners at SHAEF recommended that strategic bombers be used to prepare ground attacks.

On 14 June, a period of Anglo-Canadian set-piece attacks and wider-front US attacks began, after which Allied attacks were delayed or weakened only by the weather; Badsey wrote that the German commanders admitted defeat on 17 June but Hitler refused Rommel and Rundstedt permission to retreat. Hitler ordered the generals to hold Cherbourg instead, which condemned the Germans to a series of defeats in "hard-fought" battles that were never "close run"; Dollmann, the 7th Army commander, killed himself the next day. The German commanders interpreted apparent Allied caution according to their military ethos, which took little notice of French civilian and German army casualties, in contrast to the Allied duty to protect French civilians and use tactics which conserved manpower.

==== Terrain ====
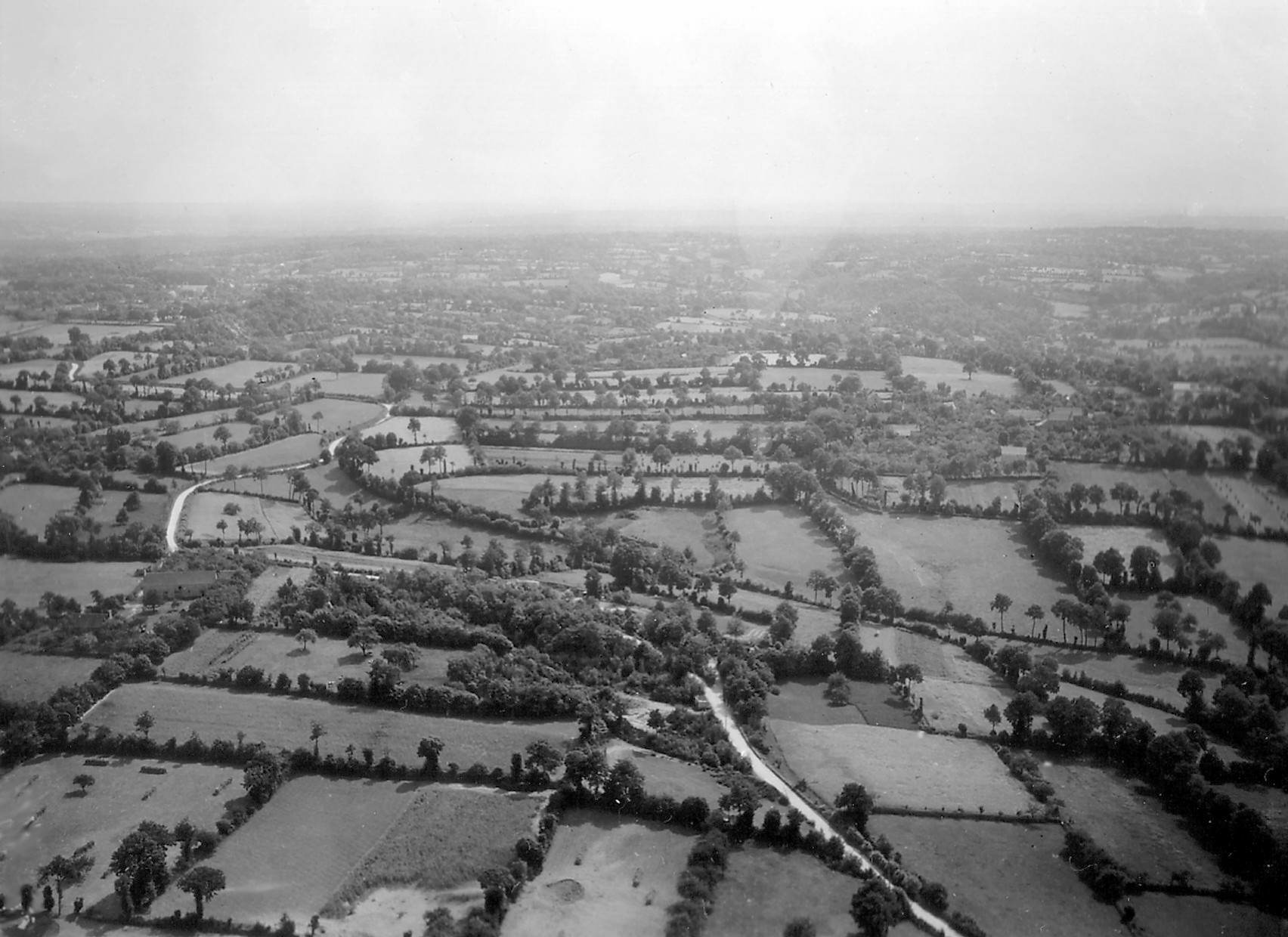
Normandy bocage, Cotentin Peninsula

Badsey wrote that accounts of the battle note the effect of terrain and weather but then go on make detailed judgements on Allied commanders, praising Eisenhower for the decision to go on 6 June in doubtful weather. Montgomery is blamed for failing to capture all of the D-Day objectives as if the weather was irrelevant, though it caused all of the airborne drops to be scattered and all of the landing forces to drift eastwards from their beaches. The narrowness of Sword forced the 3rd Infantry Division to land five brigades in series, when the 50th (Northumbrian) and 3rd Canadian divisions could land two brigades at a time on Gold and Juno. Despite the advantage of a wider beach, it was not until D+7 (8 June) that all of the 51st (Highland) Division was ashore. The slow arrival of reinforcements did much to determine the nature of Allied advances into the hinterland after D-Day. The Allies had assumed that the invasion force would be detected 12–24 hours before it arrived but the surprise achieved by the Allies nullified the dispute between German commanders over the positioning of the panzer divisions and put criticism of Allied failures into perspective.

==== Cherbourg ====
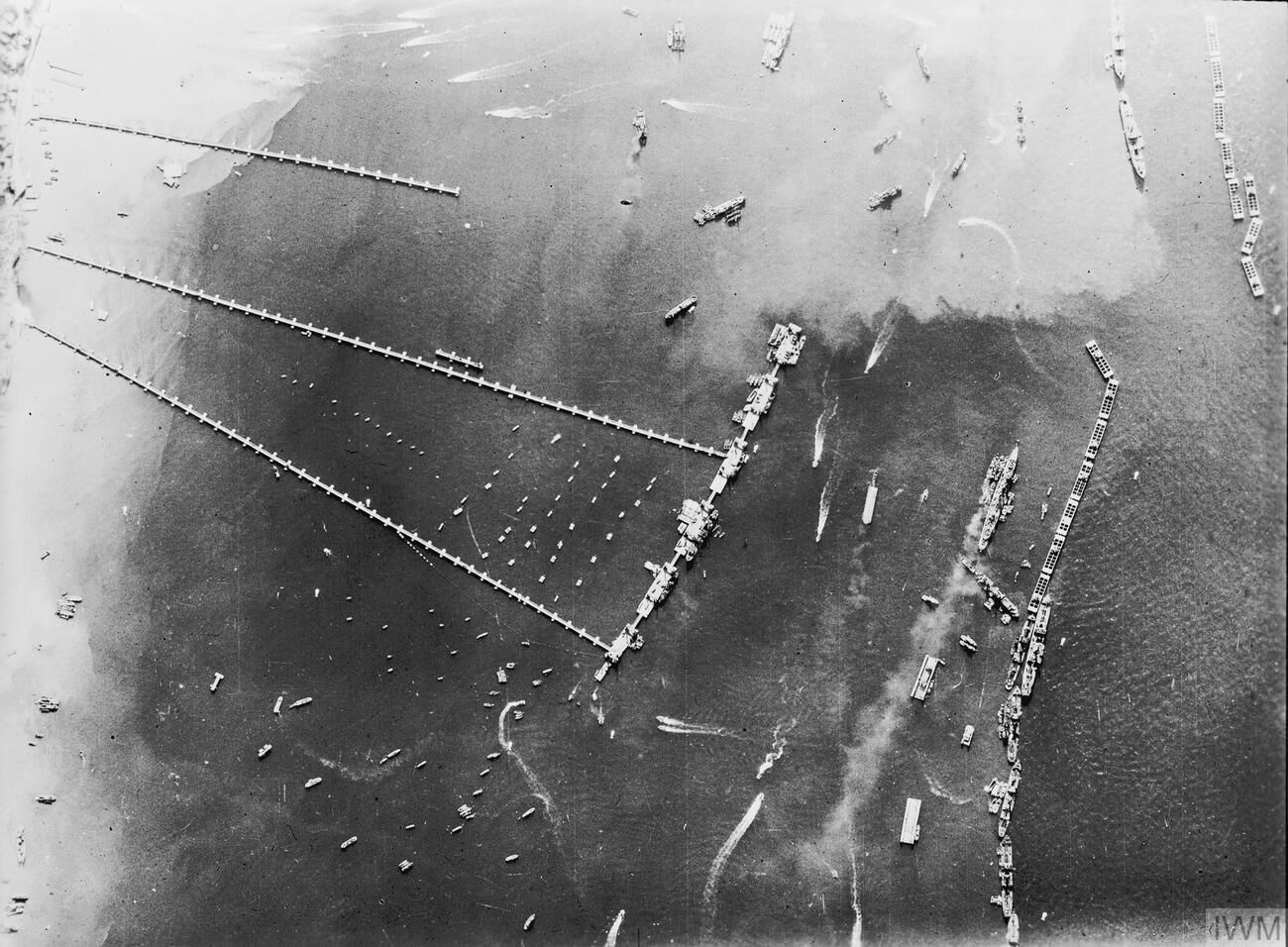
Aerial view of Mulberry B at Arromanches (27 October 1944)

Badsey wrote that histories of the battle acknowledge the importance of Cherbourg to the Allies as an entrepôt for supplies and that landing on the Calvados coast, instead of the Cotentin peninsula was a compromise, because of the defensive advantage that the terrain of the peninsula gave to the Germans and the importance of gaining ground south of Caen for airfields. The Germans assumed that Cherbourg was the Allied Schwerpunkt (point of main effort) despite being able to see the Allied Mulberry harbours being built. The Luftwaffe was ordered to make a maximum effort against Allied shipping on 7 June, yet bombing and mining sorties by Luftflotte 3 were ineffectual. None of the extant records of Heeresgruppe B and the 7th Army show any understanding that the Mulberries had freed the Allies from the need to capture Cherbourg quickly. On 14 June, the First Army surprised the Germans again, by attacking across the Cotentin Peninsula but took until D+21 to take the port, rather than the planned D+16 and only half the expected tonnage was unloaded from July. Badsey wrote that ignoring the significance of the Mulberries was caused by the German emphasis on battlefield effectiveness at the expense of supply, and because orthodox thinking stressed that Cherbourg was the closest big port to the Allied landings.

== Writing on the battle ==
=== Terry Copp, 2003 ===
In Fields of Fire: The Canadians in Normandy (2003), Terry Copp wrote that the Canadian performance in Normandy had been underestimated and described the tactical and operational flair of the Canadian army. Copp also wrote that despite demonstrating great powers of resistance, the German armies had shown no skill in defence and that their tactic of immediate counter-attack was persisted with for far too long after its futility in the face of Allied firepower had become obvious. The Germans had singularly failed to rise to the Allied challenge and that much of this was due to the Allies denying them the opportunity, a considerable tactical, operational and strategic achievement. Copp also wrote that the Anglo-Canadian armies had been criticised for a lack of a formal tank-infantry "battlegroup doctrine" similar to that used in the German armies and that this was correct; everything was allowed and armoured unit commanders chose the methods to be used, which turned out to be an advantage when they discovered in the first few days of the invasion that swift reorganisation and improvisation were needed.

=== Stephen Badsey, 2006 ===
In a 2006 essay, Stephen Badsey wrote that "typical" histories of the invasion of Normandy contain material on the debates and planning of the Allies and the Germans, then they describe the experiences of soldiers on D-Day; the accounts then stop at the beach or become judgements on performance of the senior Allied commanders. The unification of the five Allied beachheads is treated as inevitable and some authors then complain about how long it took to capture Caen. Badsey wrote that these accounts tend to jump to 13 June and the "remarkable but massively overwritten" feat by Obersturmführer Michael Wittmann at Villers-Bocage. This narrative of the battle was established by senior Allied and German officers in memoirs and in writings by loyal staff officers and sympathetic journalists. Badsey wrote that it was possible to write an alternative account and that on 7 June, Eisenhower, Montgomery and Bradley gave the same orders, that the priority was changed from an advance inland, to a merging of the beachheads. Badsey wrote that these orders were the only ones that the Allied commanders could give and that for the next few days, the commanders on both sides were reduced to waiting on events. Until the Allies achieved a united front around 12 June, events were determined by the Allied plan, the structure and training of the attacking forces and on military and national "cultures", which included the modern definition of doctrine.

Post-war debate on German defensive plans concentrated on the plans devised by Rommel which led to a compromise deployment of the panzer divisions and on the surprise achieved by Operation Neptune, which made this meaningless. Badsey wrote that the dispute between the Ostkampfer (Eastern Front veterans) who joined LXXXIV Corps late in 1943 and advocated the defensive system used in Russia and the westerners. Infantry held thinly the front line, supported by infantry and anti-tank positions several thousand yards in the rear, with a counter-attacking panzer force in reserve. Rommel and the westerners held that the extravagant quantities of firepower available to the Allies made defence in depth unworkable. The Ostkampfer wanted more fortifications inland and complained that troops working on beach defences were being tired out and deprived of training. Despite Rommel, the 709th and 352nd Infantry divisions created reserves, the 352nd Infantry Division also contributing Kampfgruppe Meyer with three battalions near Bayeux as the LXXXIV Corps reserve. With the WN network on the coast was a second defensive line on a 90–100 ft (27–30 m)-high ridge, 2,500–4,000 yd (1.4–2.3 mi; 2.3–3.7 km) inland, where reserve companies of the battalions in the beach defences and most of the German artillery were placed. Field guns closer to the beaches were dug into earth and wood emplacements and some were casemated in steel and concrete, particularly at Merville, south-east of Sword. The defensive scheme lacked a line of panzer reserves along the Caen–Cherbourg road, after Rommel sent the 352nd Infantry Division forward in March 1944 to take over some of the 716th Infantry Division frontage, sacrificing a reserve between Bayeux and the Vire estuary to the west.

=== John Buckley, 2014 ===
Buckley wrote that after the war there had been little appetite for an objective study of the British Army of 1944–1945. Some of the main personalities involved in the campaign like Churchill (The Second World War, published six volumes from 1948 to 1953), published accounts which were "hubristic" and "self-serving". De Guingand went into print with Operation Victory in 1947 and Montgomery followed in 1958, both describing a faultless campaign in which the performance of the army had been superb. When the History of the Second World War, the British official history volume of the campaign, Victory in the West: The Battle of Normandy, was published by Major Lionel Ellis et al. in 1962, it was criticised by Hubert Essame, who had led the 214th Infantry Brigade in Normandy, because the truth had been "polished out of existence in deference to Monty's subordinate commanders". Buckley called the volume "anodyne and factual" but wrote that such unrealistic accounts were not universal; in The Other Side of the Hill. Germany's Generals: Their Rise and Fall, with their own Account of Military Events 1939–1945 (1948), B. H. Liddell Hart gave a dissenting view, which portrayed a German Army that had held out for so long because its leaders understood mobile warfare, having absorbed his pre-war ideas. The Allies had used the attrition tactics of the First World War, rather than "speed and dynamism" like the Germans, who had been defeated because of a lack of resources and Hitler's madness. Liddell Hart criticised Allied troops for failing to fight their way forward with their own weapons, instead using lavish artillery and air force firepower as a crutch. (Note: Liddell Hart was later criticized for trying to restore his reputation by proving that the Germans had been students of his pre-war thinking and that Allied generals had ignored his lessons.)

In his 1952 account, Chester Wilmot, an Australian war correspondent, who had accompanied the Allies in Normandy, wrote of the concern in the 21st Army Group HQ in late June and July, when British attacks had fallen short, despite the support devoted to them. Wilmot used translated German documents to depict British soldiers suffering from poor morale and lacking in aggression, which forced the British to use artillery and air support as a substitute for infantry fighting their way forward and wrote that German defeats were caused by Allied superiority in resources, rather than German failings. Buckley wrote that the documents were not objective analyses but propaganda to bolster German morale and which reflected the emphasis on close combat in the German army. Anglo-Canadian firepower tactics were interpreted as weakness, rather than a method chosen to exploit plenty, to limit casualties and to exploit German frailties. The book was very popular and helped create the impression of quantity defeating quality, as did Men Against Fire (1947) by S.L.A. Marshall. Supposedly only 15 percent of US infantry had engaged their opponents but German "cooks and mechanics" joined in, showing the professionalism of the German Army. Marshall ignored the desperate situation of the Germans by 1944 and his data were later discredited. (Note: Marshall was posthumously exposed by Professor Roger Spiller, the Deputy Director of the Combat Studies Institute of the US Army Command and General Staff College as a fraud, who had fabricated his evidence.)

During the Cold War and the possibility of hostilities against the USSR by NATO, military analysts reviewed theory, operations and tactics and the NATO armies took the view that German methods used against the Allies from 1943 might be more effective against the Red Army than British offensive methods used from late 1942. Analysts ignored German atrocities and concentrated on theory and training, claiming that the Germans used decentralised Auftragstaktik (mission command). Buckley wrote that this failed to take account of German "...brutality, the fear, the overtly poisonous racist ideology....the criminalisation of young soldiers, the extreme coercion and...the desperation of the last year of the war". The tactical effectiveness of the German Army depended as much on these characteristics as good training and sound theory. The Anglo-Canadians were portrayed as dependent on Befehlstaktik (top-down command), which explained why the German armies had been better led and more adaptable. Montgomery denied discretion to subordinates to prevent mistakes by his inexperienced, hostilities-only conscript armies. Analysts criticised the command style of Montgomery, because he had denied initiative to subordinates and caused opportunities on the battlefield to be missed, a possibility that could lead to disaster against the Red Army.

Buckley wrote that much of the information on the supposedly better German methods came from the study of Eastern Front battles but was limited until the 1990s to German witnesses, many of whom blamed lack of numbers and Hitler's interference. When the battles in the west from June 1944 were studied, former German commanders were again consulted, who emphasised the greater resources of the Allies, the defeat of the Luftwaffe and Hitler's failings. These studies soon called British methods into question; stereotypes of fast German manoeuvres and strategic breakthroughs (blitzkrieg) led to criticism of the British for not emulating the Germans. In the 1980s, British army tours of battlefields were intended to demonstrate the inferiority of British tactics and operational methods, even when army historians disagreed. Buckley wrote that the British and US armies had selectively picked some aspects of the war to justify their decisions about warfare against the USSR. By the 1980s, a stereotype of the British as slow, predictable and dependent on the Americans had become an orthodoxy, contrasted unfavourably with the "übersoldiers" of the German Army and its Blitzkrieg tactics.

Buckley wrote that in the early 1980s, a watershed in interpretation occurred, in new publications during the fortieth anniversary of the battle. Decision in Normandy (1983) by Carlo D'Este contained a chapter describing a British aversion to hand-to-hand fighting in favour of firepower, which caused operations to be clumsy and vulnerable to German defensive methods, which contained attacks despite inferior resources. Montgomery was accused of over-control, which constrained the initiative of subordinate commanders and was also condemned for trying to re-write the history of the campaign, after the war, to claim the glory. D'Este called the result a longer campaign which was more costly in casualties than a determined approach, which could have brought a speedier victory. D'Este based some of his conclusions on the views of Air Chief Marshal Tedder, Deputy Supreme Commander to Eisenhower and Lieutenant-General Morgan, who had grudges against Montgomery. Criticism made prominent the undoubtedly disagreeable personality of Montgomery and his ability to antagonise people emerged again in the memoir literature of the 1950s; his criticism of Eisenhower being taken badly in the US. Resentment led to more scrutiny of the methods used by Montgomery and the Anglo-Canadians, especially apparent contrasts with the techniques of the US forces. (Note: Controversy lingers over Montgomery's intentions for the city of Caen.)

Max Hastings in Overlord: The Battle for Normandy (1984), compared British generals against German commanders and found them wanting; Hastings blamed British soldiers too for lacking aggression, because of the "anti-militaristic nature" of British society. The Germans in Normandy had demonstrated an "extraordinary fighting performance" and had been "glorious", despite the evil of the Nazi cause but the British had been slow and cautious, too reliant on attrition to exploit advantages. Hastings also criticised British equipment; Cromwell and Sherman tanks were judged inadequate against Panther and Tiger tanks. Buckley called this a "technocentric" explanation for battlefield performance, in which male historians tried to reduce complicated matters to easily measured technical performance. Buckley wrote that D'Este and Hastings did much to propagate the stereotype of the British army as a slow juggernaut, devoid of the dynamism and flair of the Germans. Buckley wrote that the impression of German excellence rested on a narrow definition of effectiveness, in which "close-combat" prowess, derived from ideology, tactics and greater experience, was considered in isolation. Buckley used a wider definition of effectiveness, in which intelligence, supply, planning, firepower, medical services, liaison, communications and engineering were essential counterparts to battlefield tactics.

Buckley defined operations as the organisation of military units into larger groups as building blocks to campaign objectives, linking minor tactics and politico-strategic aims. Bewegungskrieg (war of manoeuvre) the German approach to war, concentrated on manoeuvre by tanks, mechanised infantry and mobile artillery, which, even against greater numbers had achieved great success early in the war but concealed many failings in supply and strategic reality. Before mid-1941, these methods had worked well but in Operation Barbarossa against the USSR, the German armies were exhausted before they could defeat the Red Army. The army failed to conserve its resources to achieve victory and proved unable to create the conditions for success and a durable peace. Buckley wrote of much military history concentrating too much on battle and equipment and not enough on the context of political, social and economic circumstances. In 1944, the British Army in France was affected by diminishing national and military power, yet had to play an important part in the defeat of the German army for Britain to retain its Great Power status. Much British manpower was dispersed in Bomber Command, the defence of the sea communications of the empire, the Italian Campaign, the war in the Far East and the holding down of colonial subjects.

The British had to defeat the Germans with the minimum of casualties to create the circumstances necessary for a lasting peace; since the 1990s the methods used by Montgomery had been re-evaluated, with his "disagreeable....peculiar and difficult personality" being given less prominence. Monographs on parts of the army have shown that they performed well and the Canadians have been rescued from historical oblivion, through the use of "contemporary documents, reports and operational analyses", rather than journalistic writing, apologetics and testimony. In a publication of 2000, David French showed that the British Army had overcome its early defeats and was an effective fighting force in the second half of the war. In Normandy the army knew what it could do and how to defeat German forces, which had more experience. In the same year, Stephen Hart published Montgomery and Colossal Cracks: 21st Army Group in Northwest Europe 1944–5 and judged Montgomery's methods to have been right for the circumstances, that they were highly effective and that despite inadequacies, there were no better alternatives. In 2004, John Buckley argued that British tank forces had performed well in Normandy by adapting better than German armoured units. (Note: Buckley also wrote that "Goodwood was a flawed plan, poorly executed and with little chance of success", that the plan "demonstrated a poor understanding of the employment of armour in term of manoeuvring space" and that "the tactical considerations for British armour in Goodwood were considerable and quite alarming".)

== Atrocities ==
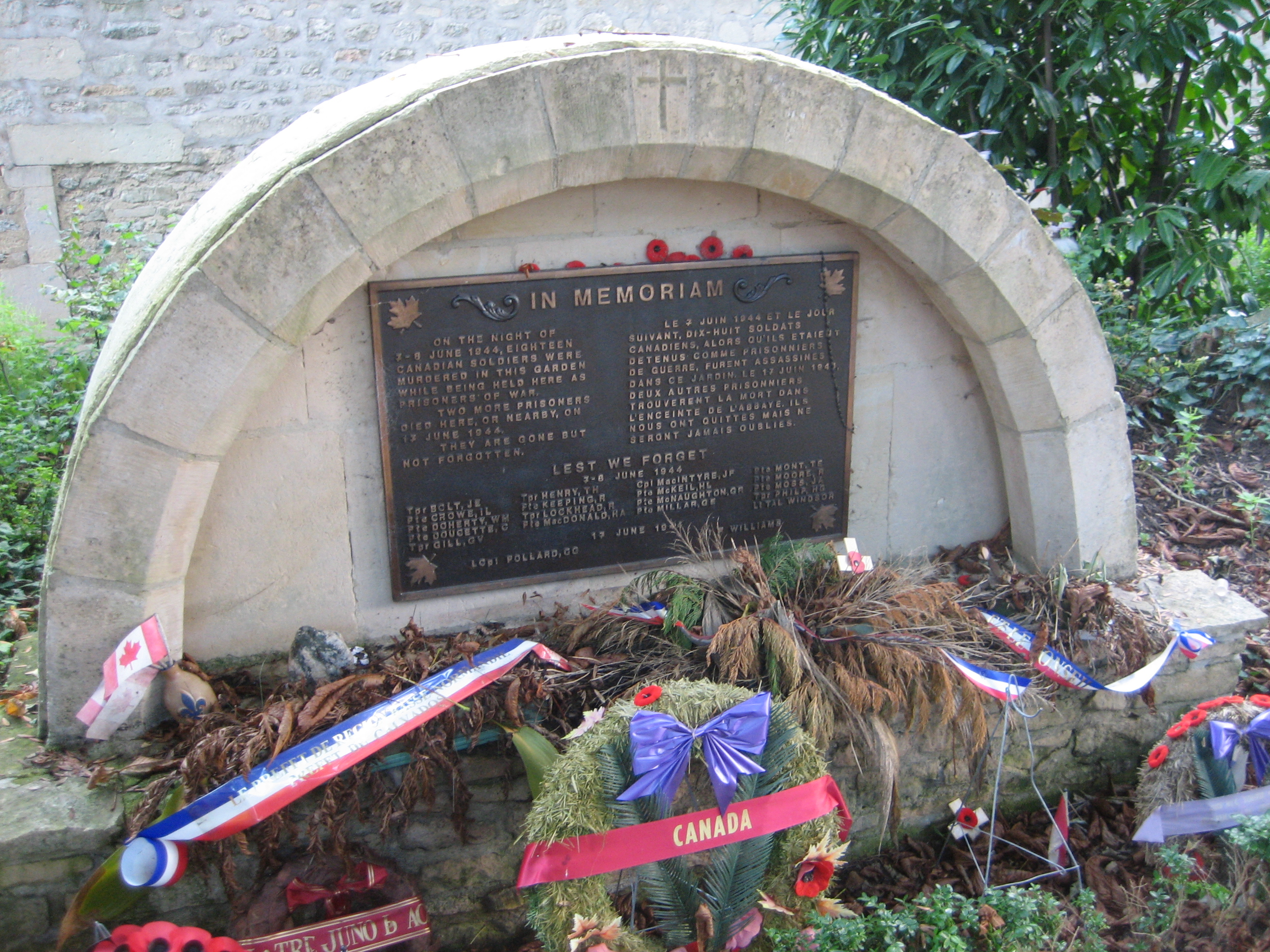
A memorial to the murdered Canadian soldiers in the garden of the Abbey.

Members of the 12th SS Panzer Division shot 156 Canadian prisoners-of-war near Caen during the Battle of Normandy. After the Battle of Le Mesnil-Patry, troops of the 12th SS Panzer Division captured seven Canadians who had been wandering around no-man's land since the battle, tired and hungry. The men were interrogated by an officer of the 12th SS-Pioniere Battalion at an ad hoc headquarters in the village of Mouen, about 5 mi (8 km) south-east of Le Mesnil-Patry. On 14 June, two crew members of the 1st Hussars reached Canadian lines and reported that they had seen several Canadian prisoners shot in the back after surrendering. At about 10:00 p.m., the men had been led to the outskirts of the village under armed guard. Four Canadian prisoners were killed by a firing squad and the remaining men were shot in the head at close-range. Twenty Canadians were killed near Villons-les-Buissons, north-west of Caen in Ardenne Abbey. The abbey was captured at midnight on 8 July by the Regina Rifles and the soldiers were exhumed and buried in the Bény-sur-Mer Canadian War Cemetery. After the war, Waffen-SS officer, Kurt Meyer, was convicted and sentenced to death on charges of inappropriate behaviour towards civilians and the execution of prisoners, a sentence later commuted to life imprisonment; he was released after serving eight years.

== Allied bombing of Caen ==
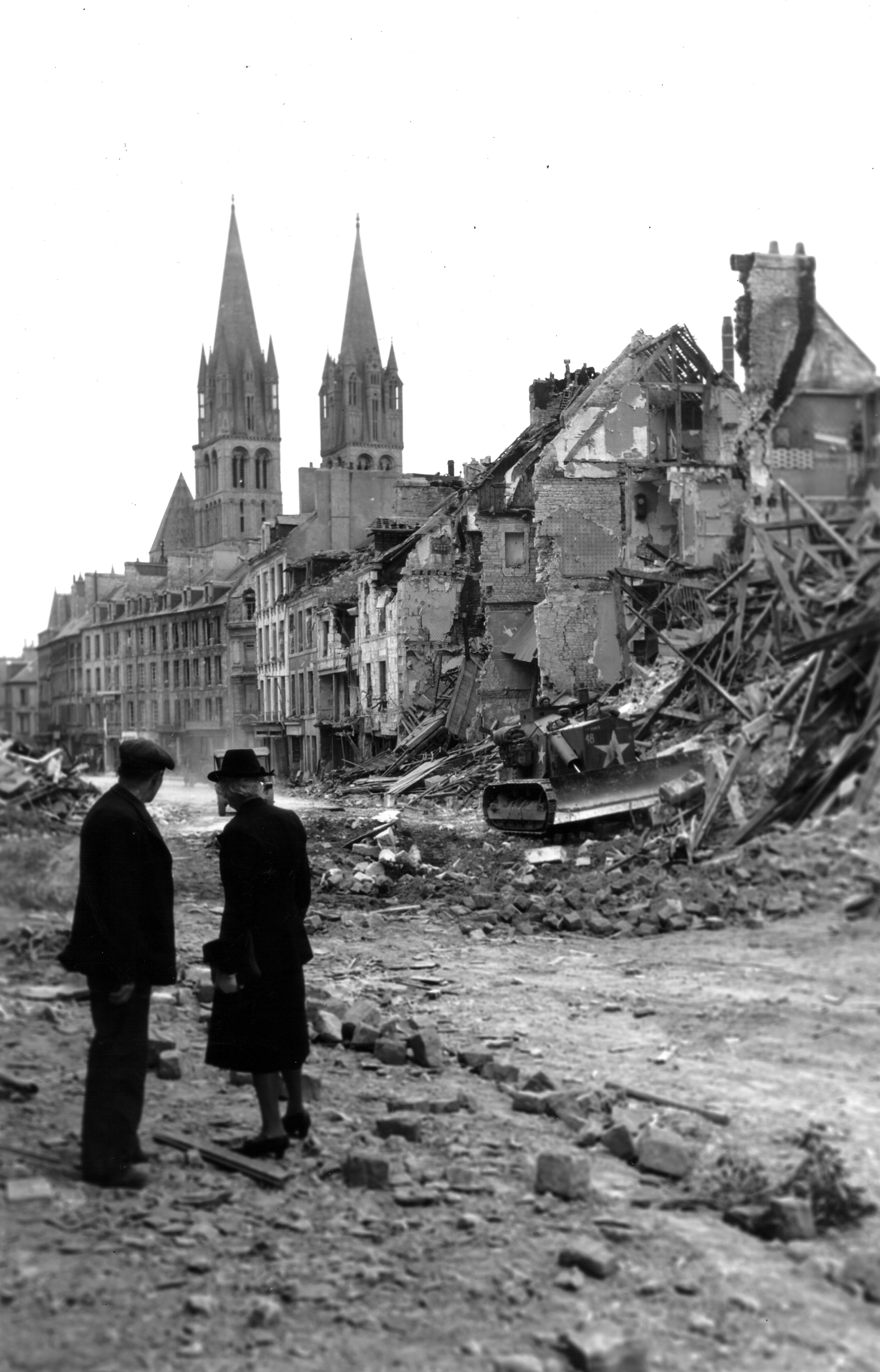
The ruins of Caen

In 2006, Peter Gray wrote that few controversies have left such a long-standing scar of the psyche of a city as the Allied bombing of Caen – the city that considers itself to have been martyred. Before the invasion, Caen had a population of 60,000 people. On 6 June, Allied aircraft dropped leaflets urging the population to leave but only a few hundred did so. Later in the day, British heavy bombers attacked the city to slow the flow of German reinforcements; 800 civilians were killed in the first 48 hours of the invasion. Streets were blocked by rubble, so the injured were taken to an emergency hospital set up in the Bon Sauveur convent. The Palais des Ducs, the church of Saint-Étienne and the railway station were all destroyed or severely damaged. About 15,000 people took refuge for more than a month in medieval quarry tunnels south of the city. Allied bombing turned much of the French countryside and the city of Caen into a wasteland. The German resistance was extremely fierce, and the Germans used the ruins to their advantage.

The Défense Passive and other civil defence groups coordinated medical relief. Six surgical teams were alerted on the morning of the invasion and police brought medical supplies to Bon Sauveur and hospitals at Lycée Malherbe and Hospice des Petites Sœurs des Pauvres. Many buildings caught fire and molten lead dripped from their roofs. About 3,000 people took refuge in Bon Sauveur, Abbaye aux Hommes and Saint Etienne church. Foraging parties were sent out into the countryside for food and old wells were re-opened. On 9 June, the bell tower of Saint Pierre was destroyed by a shell from Rodney. The Vichy government in Paris managed to send 250 short tons (230 t) supplies to Caen under the auspices of Secours Nationale.

The Germans ordered all remaining civilians to leave on 6 July and by the bombing during the evening of 7 July, only 15,000 inhabitants remained. A force of 450 heavy bombers prepared the way for Operation Charnwood. Although the delayed-action bombs were aimed at the northern edge of Caen, massive damage was again inflicted on the city centre. At least two civilian shelters were hit and the University of Caen building was destroyed, 350 people being killed by the raid and the fighting in Caen on 8 July, bringing the civilian death toll to 1,150 since D-Day. The Germans withdrew from Caen north of the Orne on 9 July and blew the last bridge. The southern suburbs liberated on 18 July by the 3rd Canadian Infantry Division.

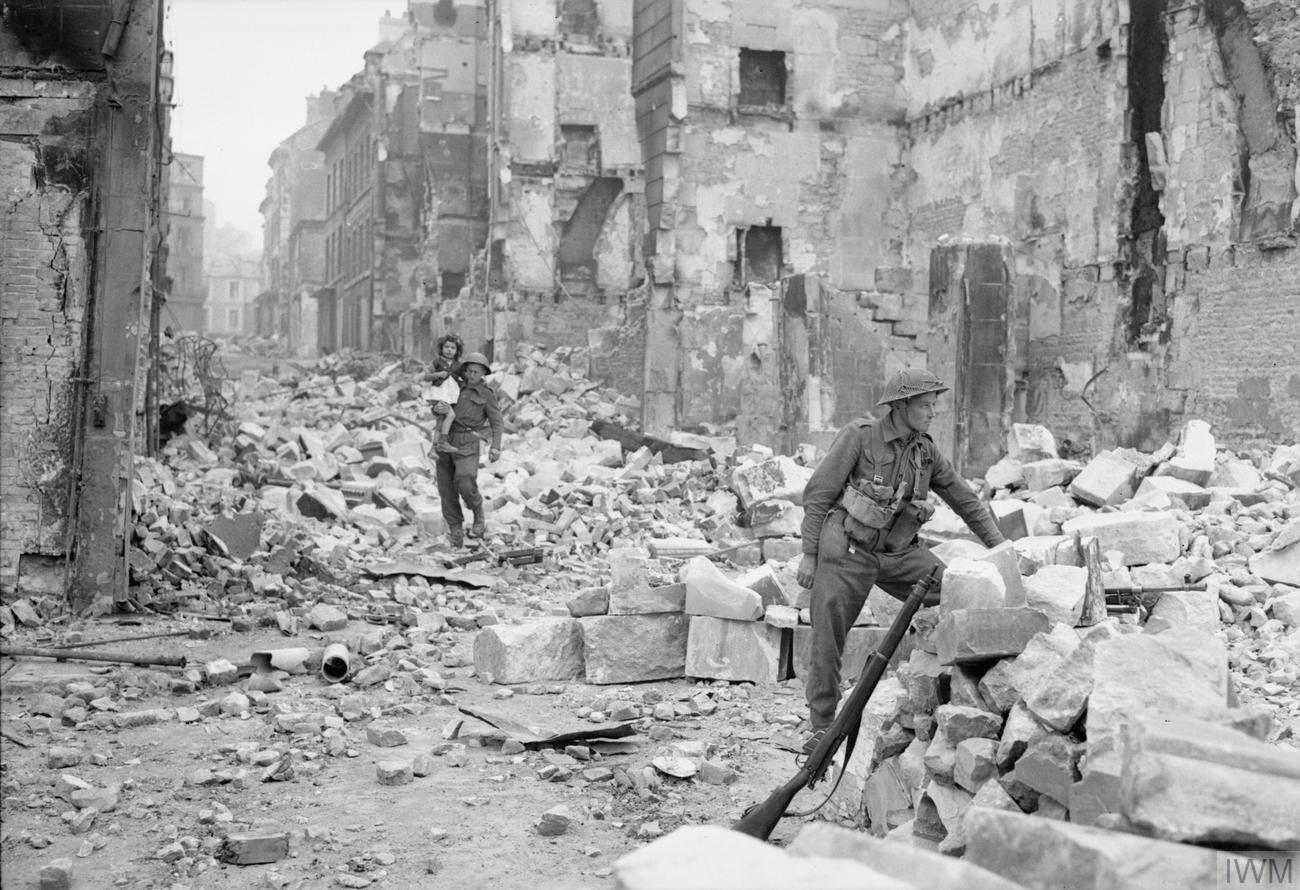
A British soldier carries a little girl through the devastation of Caen, 10 July 1944.

Gray wrote that the bombing created considerable quantities of rubble, which restricted the access for armour and actually impeded the advance into Caen. This prevented the rapid seizure of the Orne bridges, which were then destroyed by the defenders before they could be secured. The military efficacy of the bombing of Caen appears to have been somewhere between negligible and counter-productive, but the effect on the residents was devastating. Montgomery claimed that the bombing of Caen had played a vital part in its subsequent capture but Gray wrote that later assessments of this analysis range "from fantasy to guilty conscience".

Following the capture of Caen, British war correspondents for the Daily Mail reported on 28 July that,

One must drive through Caen every time one goes to or from the Orne front and it's still a horrible and rather shaming thing. The people of Caen will never quite understand why we had to do anything so awful to them. Still, day by day, the bodies of their fellow-citizens are being dug out of the ruins.

— Baldoli and Knapp

By the end of the battle, the civilian population of Caen had fallen from 60,000 to 17,000. Caen and many of the surrounding towns and villages were mostly destroyed; the University of Caen (founded in 1432) was razed. The buildings were eventually rebuilt after the war and the university adopted the phoenix as its symbol. About 35,000 residents were made homeless after the Allied bombing and the destruction of the city caused much resentment.

== Commemoration ==
A provisional wooden shop in the city, during the rebuilding in 1945.

There are many monuments to the battle and Operation Overlord. For example, on the road to Odon-bridge at Tourmauville, there is a memorial for the 15th (Scottish) Infantry Division; or the monument on hill 112 for the 53rd (Welsh) Infantry Division, as well as one for the 43rd (Wessex) Infantry Division. Near Hill 112, a forest was planted in memory of those who fought there.

The landings at Normandy, the battle and the Second World War are remembered today with many memorials; Caen hosts the Mémorial with a peace museum (Musée de la paix). The museum was built by the city of Caen on top of where the bunker of General Wilhelm Richter, the commander of the 716th Infantry Division, was located. On 6 June 1988 French President François Mitterrand and twelve ambassadors from countries that took part in the fighting in Normandy joined to open the museum. The museum is dedicated to pacifism and borders the Parc international pour la Libération de l'Europe, a garden in remembrance of the Allied participants in the invasion.

The fallen are buried in the Brouay War Cemetery (377 graves), the Banneville-la-Campagne War Cemetery (2,170 graves), the Bény-sur-Mer Canadian War Cemetery (2,049 graves), the Bretteville-sur-Laize Canadian War Cemetery (2,957 graves), La Cambe German war cemetery (21,222 graves) as well as many more.

== Orders of battle ==
- List of Allied forces in the Normandy Campaign
- Juno Beach order of battle
- Operation Perch order of battle
- Battle of Villers-Bocage order of battle
- Order of battle for Operation Epsom
- Operation Goodwood order of battle

== See also ==
- Bombing of Normandy
