= Operation Goodwood order of battle =

British Army offensive operation

Opposing commanders

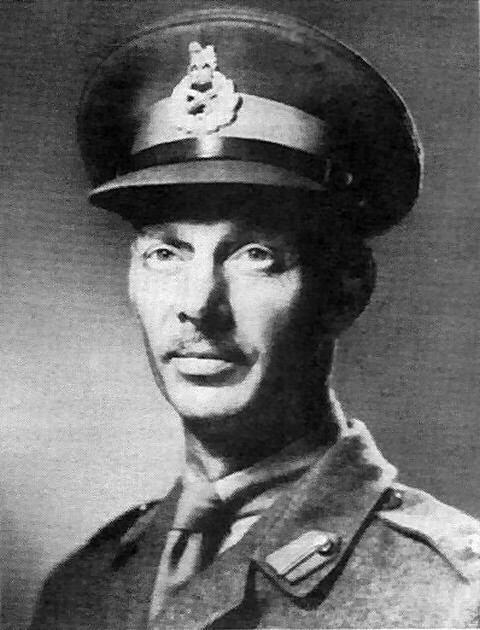
Lt.-Gen. Miles Dempsey

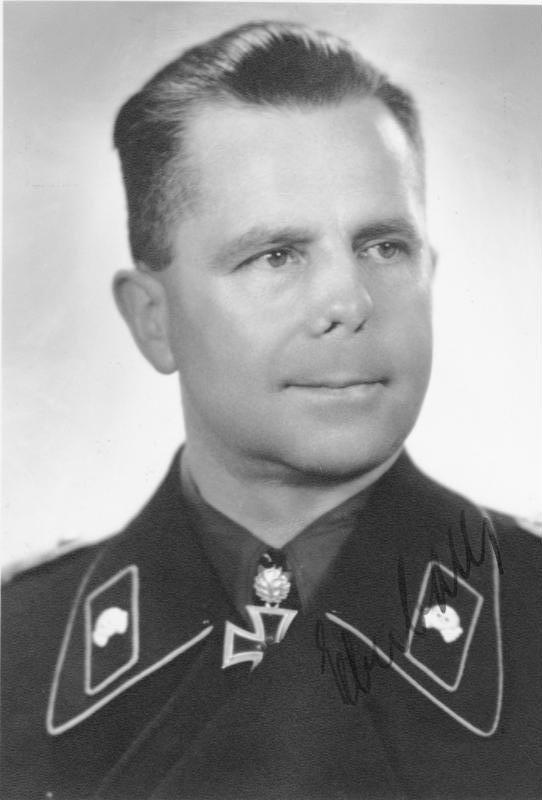
Gnl der PzTr Heinrich Eberbach

Operation Goodwood was an offensive operation by the British Army against the German Wehrmacht, which took place between 18 and 20 July 1944 as part of the larger battle for Caen in Normandy, France during the Second World War.

While Goodwood failed in its primary aim, it forced the Germans to keep powerful formations opposite the British and Canadians on the eastern flank of the Normandy beachhead and Operation Cobra, the First US Army attack which began on 25 July, caused the weaker German defences opposite to collapse.

== British Order of Battle ==
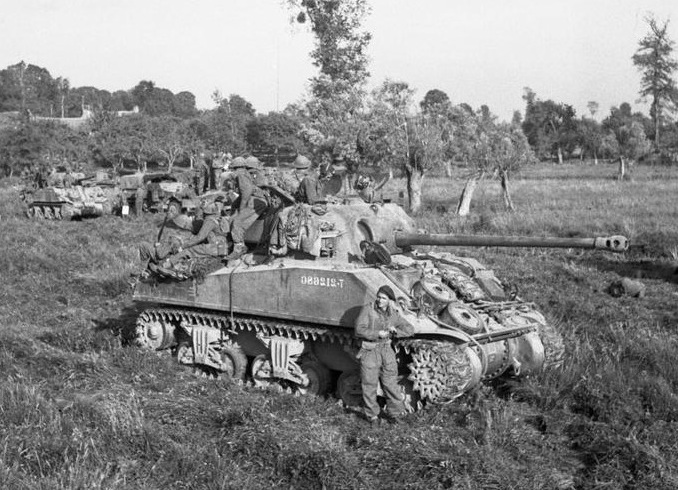
Sherman Firefly awaiting orders to move forward Operation Goodwood July 1944

Second Army
Lieutenant-General Miles Dempsey

Army troops

4th Army Group Royal Artillery
8th Army Group Royal Artillery
79th Armoured Division (elements)
Major-General Percy Hobart

5th Assault Regiment, Royal Engineers (Churchill AVRE)
22nd Dragoons (Sherman Crab mine flails)
141st Regiment, Royal Armoured Corps (Churchill Crocodile flamethrower tanks)
1st Lothians and Border Horse (Sherman Crabs)

I Corps
Lieutenant-General John Crocker

3rd Infantry Division

Major-General Lashmer Whistler

Divisional troops

3rd (Royal Northumberland Fusiliers) Reconnaissance Regiment, Royal Armoured Corps
7th, 33rd, 76th Field Regiments, Royal Artillery
20th Anti Tank Regiment, Royal Artillery
20th Light Anti Aircraft Regiment, Royal Artillery
2nd Battalion, Middlesex Regiment (machine gun battalion)

8th Infantry Brigade

1st Battalion, Suffolk Regiment
2nd Battalion, East Yorkshire Regiment
1st Battalion, South Lancashire Regiment (The Prince of Wales's Volunteers)

9th Infantry Brigade

2nd Battalion, Lincolnshire Regiment
1st Battalion, King's Own Scottish Borderers
2nd Battalion, Royal Ulster Rifles

185th Infantry Brigade

2nd Battalion, Royal Warwickshire Regiment
1st Battalion, Royal Norfolk Regiment
2nd Battalion, King's Shropshire Light Infantry

27th Armoured Brigade (attached)

13th/18th Royal Hussars (Queen Mary's Own)
1st East Riding Yeomanry

51st (Highland) Infantry Division

Major-General D.C. Bullen-Smith

Divisional troops

2nd Derbyshire Yeomanry (reconnaissance)
126th, 127th and 128th Field Regiments, Royal Artillery
61st Anti Tank Regiment, Royal Artillery
40th Light Anti Aircraft Regiment, Royal Artillery
1st/7th Battalion, Middlesex Regiment (machine gun battalion)

152nd (Highland) Infantry Brigade

2nd Battalion, Seaforth Highlanders
5th Battalion, Seaforth Highlanders
5th Battalion, Queen's Own Cameron Highlanders

153rd Highland Infantry Brigade

5th Battalion, Black Watch
1st Battalion, Gordon Highlanders
5th/7th Battalion, Gordon Highlanders

154th (Highland) Infantry Brigade

1st Battalion, Black Watch
7th Battalion, Black Watch
7th Battalion, Argyll and Sutherland Highlanders

VIII Corps
Lieutenant-General Richard O'Connor

Guards Armoured Division
Major-General Allan Henry Shafto Adair

Divisional troops

55th and 153rd Field Regiments, Royal Artillery
21st Anti Tank Regiment, Royal Artillery
94th Light Anti Aircraft Regiment, Royal Artillery
2nd Battalion, Welsh Guards (armoured reconnaissance)

5th Guards Armoured Brigade

2nd (Armoured) Battalion, Grenadier Guards
1st (Armoured) Battalion, Coldstream Guards
2nd (Armoured) Battalion, Irish Guards
1st (Motor) Battalion, Grenadier Guards

32nd Guards Infantry Brigade

5th Battalion, Coldstream Guards
3rd Battalion, Irish Guards
1st Battalion, Welsh Guards

7th Armoured Division
Major-General George Erskine

Divisional troops

8th King's Royal Irish Hussars (reconnaissance)
3rd Regiment, Royal Horse Artillery
5th Regiment, Royal Horse Artillery
65th Anti Tank Regiment, Royal Artillery
15th Light Anti Aircraft Regiment, Royal Artillery

22nd Armoured Brigade

1st Royal Tank Regiment
5th Royal Tank Regiment
4th County of London Yeomanry (Sharpshooters)
1st Battalion, Rifle Brigade

131st (Queens) Infantry Brigade

1st/5th Battalion, Queen's Royal Regiment (West Surrey)
1st/6th Battalion, Queen's Royal Regiment (West Surrey)
1st/7th Battalion, Queen's Royal Regiment (West Surrey)

11th Armoured Division
Major-General George "Pip" Roberts

Divisional troops

2nd Northamptonshire Yeomanry (reconnaissance)
The Inns of Court Regiment (reconnaissance; attached)
13th Regiment, Royal Horse Artillery (Honourable Artillery Company)
151st Field Regiment, Royal Artillery
75th Anti Tank Regiment, Royal Artillery
58th Light Anti Aircraft Regiment, Royal Artillery

29th Armoured Brigade

23rd Hussars
3rd Royal Tank Regiment
2nd Fife and Forfar Yeomanry
8th Battalion, Rifle Brigade

159th Infantry Brigade

4th Battalion, King's Shropshire Light Infantry
3rd Battalion, Monmouthshire Regiment
1st Battalion, Herefordshire Regiment

== German Order of Battle ==
Panzer Group West
General der Panzertruppe Heinrich Eberbach

I SS Panzer Corps
SS-Obergruppenführer Josef "Sepp" Dietrich

Corps troops

101st SS Heavy Panzer Battalion
101st SS Artillery Battalion
7th Werfer Brigade

83rd and 84th Werfer Regiments

1st SS Panzer Division Leibstandarte SS Adolf Hitler
SS-Obergruppenführer Theodor Wisch

1st SS Panzer Regiment
1st SS Reconnaissance Battalion
1st SS Panzergrenadier Regiment
2nd SS Panzergrenadier Regiment
1st SS Artillery Regiment

12th SS Panzer Division Hitlerjugend
SS-Brigadeführer Kurt Meyer

12th SS Panzer Regiment
12th SS Reconnaissance Battalion
25th SS Panzergrenadier Regiment
26th SS Panzergrenadier Regiment
12th SS Artillery Regiment

272nd Infantry Division
Major General Friedrich Schack

980th Infantry Regiment
981st Infantry Regiment
982nd Infantry Regiment
272nd Reconnaissance Battalion
272nd Artillery Regiment
272nd Anti Tank Battalion

LXXXVI Corps
General der Infanterie Hans von Obstfelder

Corps troops

503rd Heavy Panzer Battalion
9th Werfer Brigade

14th and 54th Werfer Regiments

555th, 763rd, 1151st and 1193rd Artillery Battalions
1255th Heavy Coastal Artillery Battalion
1039th and 1053rd Anti Tank Battalions
725th Railway Artillery Battalion

16th Luftwaffe Field Division
Major General Karl Sievers

31st Rifle Regiment
32nd Rifle Regiment
46th Rifle Regiment
16th Luftwaffe Artillery Regiment
16th Luftwaffe Anti Tank Battalion

21st Panzer Division
Brigadier General Edgar Feuchtinger

22nd Panzer Regiment
125th Panzergrenadier Regiment
192nd Panzergrenadier Regiment
21st Reconnaissance Battalion
155th Artillery Regiment
200th Assault Gun Battalion

346th Infantry Division
Major General Erich Straube

857th Infantry Regiment
858th Infantry Regiment
346th Reconnaissance Battalion
346th Artillery Regiment
346th Anti Tank Battalion

711th Infantry Division
Major General Josef Reichert

731st Infantry Regiment
744th Infantry Regiment
711th Anti Tank Company
1711th Artillery Regiment

== See also ==
- List of orders of battle

== Bibliography ==
- Trew, Simon; Badsey, Stephen (2004). Battle for Caen. Battle Zone Normandy. Faber and Faber. ISBN 0-7509-3010-1.
