= Battle of Villers-Bocage order of battle =

This is the order of battle for the Battle of Villers-Bocage, a World War II battle on 13 June 1944 between British and German forces in Normandy, France as part of Operation Perch.

== British order of battle ==
The 22nd Armoured Brigade group, was made up of Corps and Divisional troops from XXX Corps and the 7th Armoured Division as well as elements of the divisional 22nd Armoured Brigade and 131st (Queens) Infantry Brigade.

The Brigade group was placed under the command of the 22nd Armoured Brigade commanding officer, Brigadier W. R. N. "Looney" Hinde.

- XXX Corps - Lieutenant-General G. C. Bucknall
  - 7th Armoured Division - Major-General G. W. E. J. Erskine
    - 22nd Armoured Brigade group (Brigadier W. R. N. Hinde)
      - 1st Battalion Rifle Brigade
        - A Company (minus Scout platoon), C and I Companies
        - Support Company, one AT Section attached to each rifle company
      - 1/5th Battalion Queen's Royal Regiment (West Surrey)
        - A, B, C and D Companies
      - 1/7th Battalion Queen's Royal Regiment (West Surrey)
        - A, B, C and D Companies
      - 4th County of London Yeomanry (Sharpshooters) (Cromwell, Sherman Firefly and M5 Stuart tanks)
        - Headquarters Troop
        - Reconnaissance Troop
        - A, B and C Squadrons
      - 5th Regiment, Royal Horse Artillery (Sexton self-propelled gun)
        - C, G and K Batteries
      - 5th Royal Tank Regiment (Cromwell, Firefly and M5 Stuarts)
        - A, B and C Squadrons
      - 8th (King's Royal Irish) Hussars (Cromwell)
        - Headquarters Troop
        - A and B Squadrons
      - 11th Hussars (Prince Albert's Own) (Daimler Armoured Car)
        - Headquarters Troop
        - C Squadron
      - 65th (Norfolk Yeomanry) Anti-Tank Regiment, Royal Artillery
        - 260th Anti Tank Battery (M10 3in SP Gun )

== German order of battle ==
- I SS Panzer Corps - SS-Oberst-Gruppenführer (General) Josef Dietrich
  - Panzer-Lehr-Division - Generalleutnant (Major-general) Fritz Bayerlein
    - Panzer Lehr Regiment 130 (Panzer IV)
  - SS Heavy Panzer Battalion 101 (Schwere SS-Panzer-Abteilung 101) (SS-Obersturmbannführer Heinz von Westernhagen)
    - 1st Panzerkompanie (Note: a Panzerkompanie is equivalent to a British squadron, while a "Panzergrenadierkompanie" is similar to a company) (Tiger I) Rolf Möbius
    - 2nd Panzerkompanie (Tiger I) Michael Wittmann
    - 4th Escort Company
- XLVII Panzer Corps - General der Panzertruppen (lieutenant-general) Hans Freiherr von Funck
  - 2nd Panzer Division (elements) - Major-General Heinrich Freiherr von Lüttwitz

== See also ==
- List of orders of battle

== Notes and references ==
Notes

Citations

Bibliography

- Clarke, Dudley (1952). The Eleventh At War: Being The Story Of The XIth Hussars (Prince Albert's Own) Through The Years 1934–1945. Michael Joseph. OCLC 10627049.
- Ellis, Major L. F. (2004) [1st. pub. HMSO:1962]. Butler, Sir James (ed.). Victory in the West: The Battle of Normandy. History of the Second World War, United Kingdom Military Series. Vol. I. Uckfield, UK: Naval & Military Press. ISBN 1-845740-58-0.
- FitzRoy, Olivia (1961). Men of Valour: The Third Volume of the History of the VIII King's Royal Irish Hussars, 1927–1958. Sir Geoffrey V. Bates. OCLC 30221741.
- Forty, George (2004). Villers Bocage. Battle Zone Normandy. Sutton. ISBN 0-7509-3012-8.
- Major Hastings, R. H. W. S. (1950). The Rifle Brigade In The Second World War 1939–1945. Gale & Polden. OCLC 480361235.
- Taylor, Daniel (1999). Villers-Bocage Through the Lens. After the Battle. ISBN 1-870067-07-X.
