= Tarasenko =

Tarasenko, Tarassenko, or Tarasenka (Ukrainian: Тарасенко; Belarusian: Тарасенка) is an East Slavic surname, derived from the male given name Taras. It may refer to:

- Andrey Tarasenko (disambiguation), multiple individuals
- Felix Tarasenko (1932–2021), Russian mathematician
- Georgy Tarasenko (1996-2022), Ukrainian activist and volunteer, Hero of Ukraine
- Kateryna Tarasenko (born 1987), Ukrainian Olympic rower
- Lionel Tarassenko (born 1957), British engineer, academic and life peer
- Mikhail Tarasenko (1947–2025), Russian politician
- Oleh Tarasenko (born 1990), Ukrainian footballer
- Oleksandr Tarasenko (disambiguation), multiple individuals
- Stanislav Tarasenko (born 1966), Russian long jumper
- Tamara Tarasenko (1939–1992), Ukrainian philosopher
- Taras Tarasenko (born 1980), Ukrainian lawyer
- Vadim Tarasenko (born 1994), Russian speedway rider
- Valery Tarasenka (born 1981), Belarusian footballer
- Vasyl Tarasenko (1907–2001), Ukrainian diplomat
- Vladimir Tarasenko (born 1991), Russian ice hockey player
- Yevhen Tarasenko (born 1983), Ukrainian footballer
- Yuliya Tarasenko (disambiguation), multiple individuals
