= Tamara Tarasenko =

Soviet Ukrainian philosopher

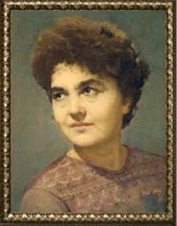
Portrait by L.L. Gormakh

Tamara Andriivna Tarasenko (Ukrainian: Тамара Андріївна Тарасенко, Russian: Тамара Андреевна Тарасенко, romanized: Tamara Andreyevna Tarasenko; May 24, 1939 – May 23, 1992) was a Soviet Ukrainian professor, philosopher, the first chairman of the Board of Dr. Haass Social Assistance Fund (1987).

Graduated with honors from the philological faculty of the Odesa State I. I. Mechnykov University (OSU) in 1961. PhD thesis - "Regulatory Aspects of Social Functioning of the Language” (1974).

Worked as a Russian language and literature teacher, senior librarian at the University Scientific Library, professor at the Department of Philosophy, Head of the Department of Philosophy, Director of the Odesa State University Library.

== Head of the Social Assistance Fund ==
According to the memoirs of one of the founders of the Dr. Haass Social Assistance Fund, a distinguished lawyer of Ukraine Alexander Muchnik, on November 26, 1987, T. A. Tarasenko was elected the first chairman of the Board of one of the first in the USSR non-governmental charitable organization. Occupying the post of the Head of the Department of Philosophy at the Odesa State University, T.A. Tarasenko played an important role in the official legalization of the charitable organization under the difficult conditions of the Soviet bureaucracy. As the Head of the Foundation she was personally involved in the direct provision of social assistance to people in need. T.A.Tarasenko laid the tradition in charity management system of moral, dedicated and selfless service to others.

== Scientific and teaching activities ==
According to numerous memoirs of her colleagues, T.A. Tarasenko was one of the first in the Soviet Union to develop and begin delivering lectures on the History of Russian 20th century philosophy. Thanks to her, students of the university first got to know the works of Berdyaev, Bulgakov, Ilyin, Lossky, Rozanov, Solovyov, Fedorov, Florensky, Florovsky, Frank, Shestov et al. at that time kept in special depositories. In her lectures and seminars T. A. Tarasenko practiced the method of the famous Soviet philosopher Genrikh S. Batishchev (1932–1990) - a "deep dialogue", a dialogue that involves not only mind but also conscience, a moral component of the personality of her students.

According to various sources, Tarasenko emphasized respect for students’ individual characteristics and provided support to those in need.

In 1991, being seriously ill and suffering from pain, she carried on teaching, delivering lectures and seminars. She considered it her duty to complete the course of lectures for the Law faculty students.

== Memory ==
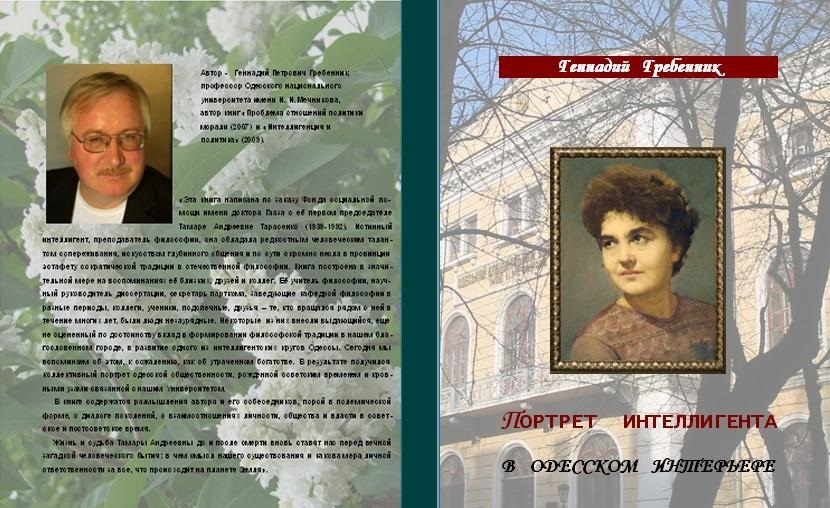

Died on May 23, 1992, buried in the North Cemetery of Odesa.

The memory of T. A. Tarasenko was engraved in the book by the Odesa State University professor Gennady P. Grebennik "Intellectual Portrait in Odesa Interior. A Story about Tamara Tarasenko, and not only about her". G. Grebennik wrote:

“She lived next to us, but the secret of her existence was hidden from us. She was the only person I have encountered on my way who practiced a great, now vanished, tradition in Philosophy - the tradition of Socrates. She was a philosopher in the true sense of the word, because her purpose was not to discover formal scientific laws, but life itself in the harmony of all its aspects. Such is the mystery of her life, revealed to us after her death.”

At the request of the Fund the artist Lazar L. Gormakh (1924–2000) wrote in pastel a portrait of T. A. Tarasenko, displayed in the Fund along with the portraits of Friedrich Joseph Haass and Mother Teresa.
