= 2024 northern Kharkiv offensive order of battle =

This is the order of battle for the 2024 northern Kharkiv offensive of the Russo-Ukrainian War. Russian forces crossed the border with Ukraine north of the city of Kharkiv on 10 May 2024, opening a new front.

== Russian forces ==
Northern Group of Forces

- 6th Combined Arms Army (elements)
  - 68th Guards Motor Rifle Division
  - 69th Guards Motor Rifle Division
  - 1009th Motor Rifle Regiment (elements)
- 11th Army Corps (majority)
  - 18th Guards Motor Rifle Division (elements)
    - 11th Tank Regiment elements
    - 79th Motor Rifle Regiment
  - 7th Motor Rifle Regiment elements
- 44th Army Corps (majority)
  - 128th Motor Rifle Brigade elements
  - 72nd Motor Rifle Division elements
  - 30th Motor Rifle Regiment elements
  - 41st Motor Rifle Regiment elements
- 155th Naval Infantry Brigade
- 810th Guards Naval Infantry Brigade elements
- 83rd Guards Air Assault Brigade
- 136th Guards Motor Rifle Brigade
- 2nd Guards Spetsnaz Brigade
- 47th Tank Division elements
  - 380th Motor Rifle Regiment elements
  - 245th Motor Rifle Regiment (elements)
  - 153rd Tank Regiment (elements)
    - "Storm" detachment
  - 4th Volunteer Reconnaissance and Assault Brigade elements
- 18th Mechanized Brigade elements
- 1008th Motor Rifle Regiment elements
- "Phoenix" special mining battalion, 11th Engineering Brigade
- Akhmat Spetsnaz elements
  - "Vakha" battalion elements
  - "Aida" group elements
  - Zapad-Akhmat Battalion
  - Akhmat Bati Spetsnaz
  - "Okhotnik" detachment elements
    - "Canada" group elements
  - 204th Akhmat Spetsnaz Regiment
    - Izi Group
- 9th Separate Guards Motor Rifle Brigade, 51st Guards Combined Arms Army (elements)
- "Antagonist" drone detachment
- National Guard of Russia
  - 116th Special Purpose Brigade
  - Stal'naya Brigade
- Storm-Z units
- Africa Corps elements
- Ministry of defense
  - Sheikh Mansur volunteer battalion

== Ukrainian forces ==
Vovchansk front:

- 3rd Assault Brigade
- 36th Marine Brigade
- 57th Motorised Brigade
- 71st Jaeger Brigade
- 82nd Air Assault Brigade (starting 12 May 2024)
- 116th Mechanized Brigade
- Liut Brigade
- Russian Volunteer Corps
- Active Action unit "Kraken"
- Freikorps
- 101st Guard Brigade Of General Staff

Lyptsi front:

- 13th Khartiia Brigade
- 42nd Mechanised Brigade
- 92nd Assault Brigade
