= Institute of Democracy and Human Rights =

Ukrainian non-governmental organization

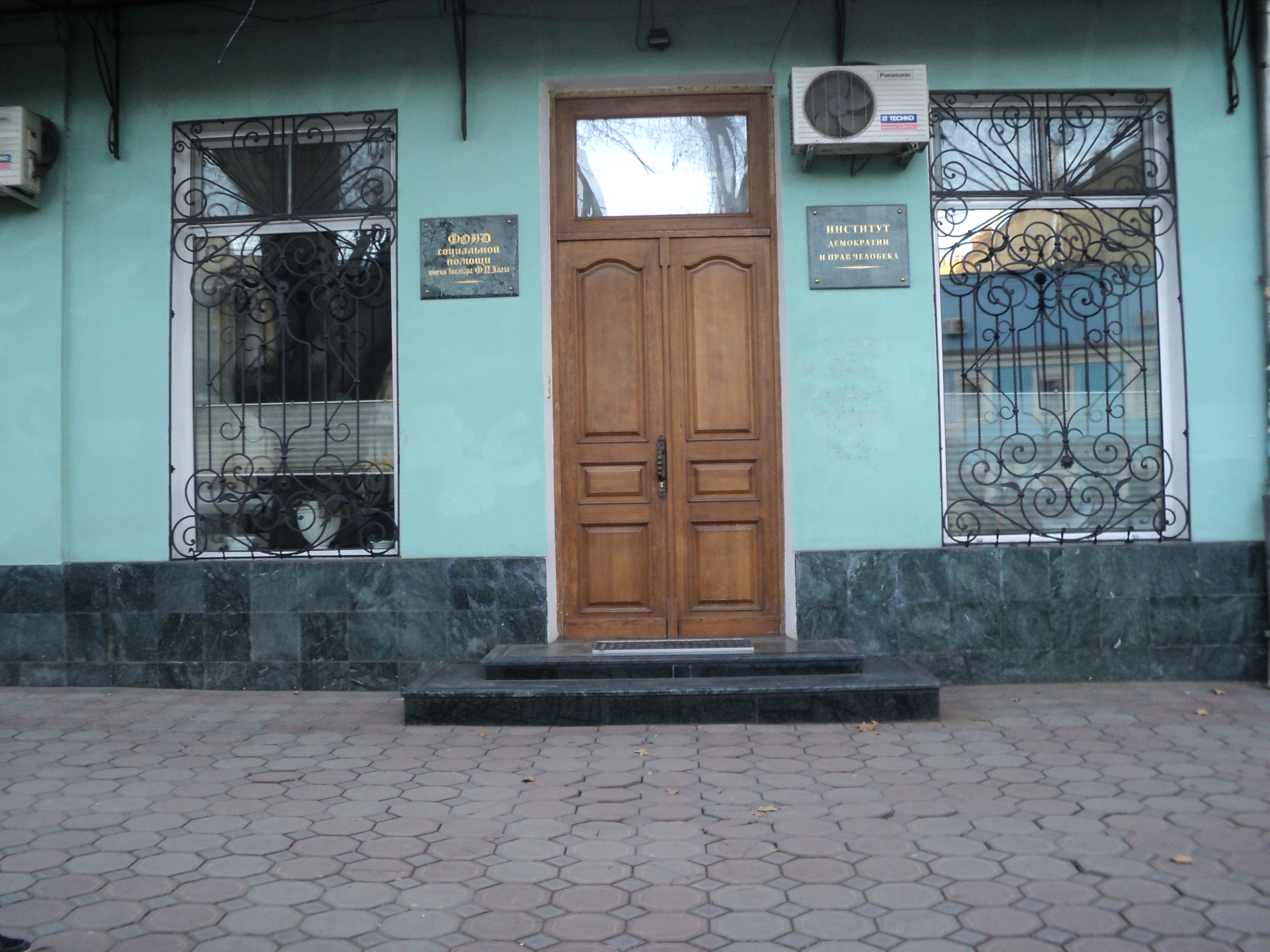
The office of the Institute of democracy and human rights (Odesa, Ukraine).

The Institute of Democracy and Human Rights is a non-profit and non-governmental organization founded by Dr. Haass Social Assistance Fund on June 15, 2000 in Odesa, Ukraine.

== Establishment, legal form, aims, structure, team ==
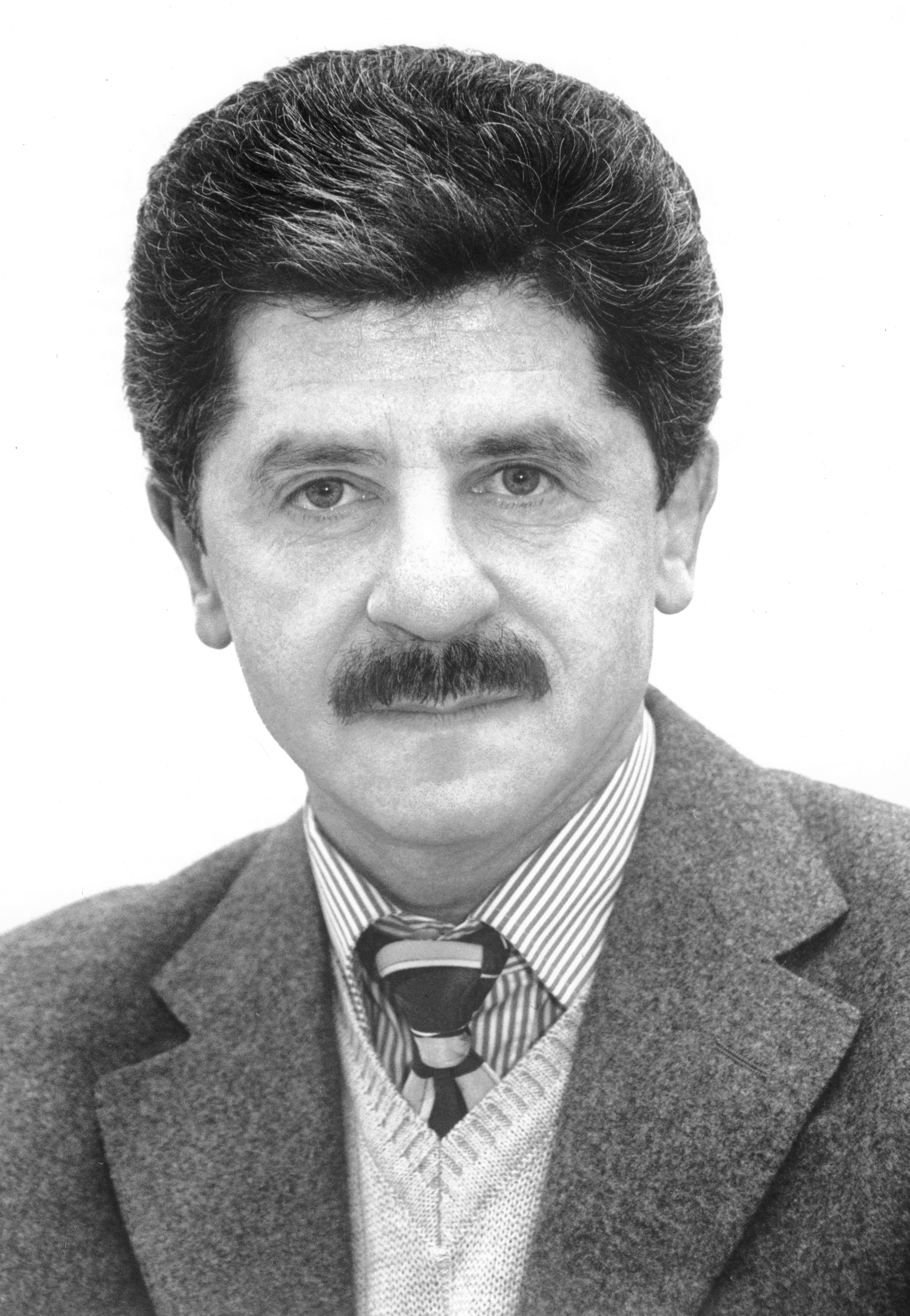
Alexander Muchnik - President of the Institute of Democracy and Human Rights

The Initiator of the foundation and President of the Institute is Honored Lawyer of Ukraine, a scientific consultant of the President of Ukraine on the questions of human rights and constitutional law (2002-2005) — Alexander Muchnik.

First Vice-President of the Institute is G.B. Tsyrfa.

The main mission of the Institute is legal education, formation of the legal culture, creation of the civil society and jural state, and carrying out all kinds of research on issues related to the protection of human rights and freedoms in Ukraine.

There are the following departments within the Institute:

- Department on the issues of International human rights law;
- Department on general issues of constitutional law;
- Department on issues of freedom and human rights ensurance;
- Department on issues of local and regional self-government;
- Department on issues of the creation of civil society and jural state;
- Department on the issues of judicial reform.

At different time in the activities of the Institute took part:

- Doctor of Law, Professor, Academician of the Ukrainian Academy of Sciences, Honored Worker of Science and Technology of Ukraine Mikhail A. Baimuratov;
- The first rector of the Law Institute of the Odesa State University named after I.I.Mechnikov, Doctor of Law, Professor, Academician of the National Academy of Sciences of Ukraine Anatoly S. Vasilyev;
- Doctor of Law, Professor, Honored Worker of Science and Technology of Ukraine Alexander K. Vishnyakov;
- Doctor of Law, Professor, Academician of the Ukrainian Academy of National Progress Igor V. Postika;
- Doctor of Law, Professor, Honored lawyer of Ukraine Oleksandra N. Rudnyeva;
- Doctor of Political Sciences, Professor Oleg A. Dolzhenkov;
- Ph.D of Legal Sciences Yuriy V. Melnyk;
- lawyer Georgiy B. Tsyrfa;
- lawyer Leonid A. Muchnik

== Legal activities ==
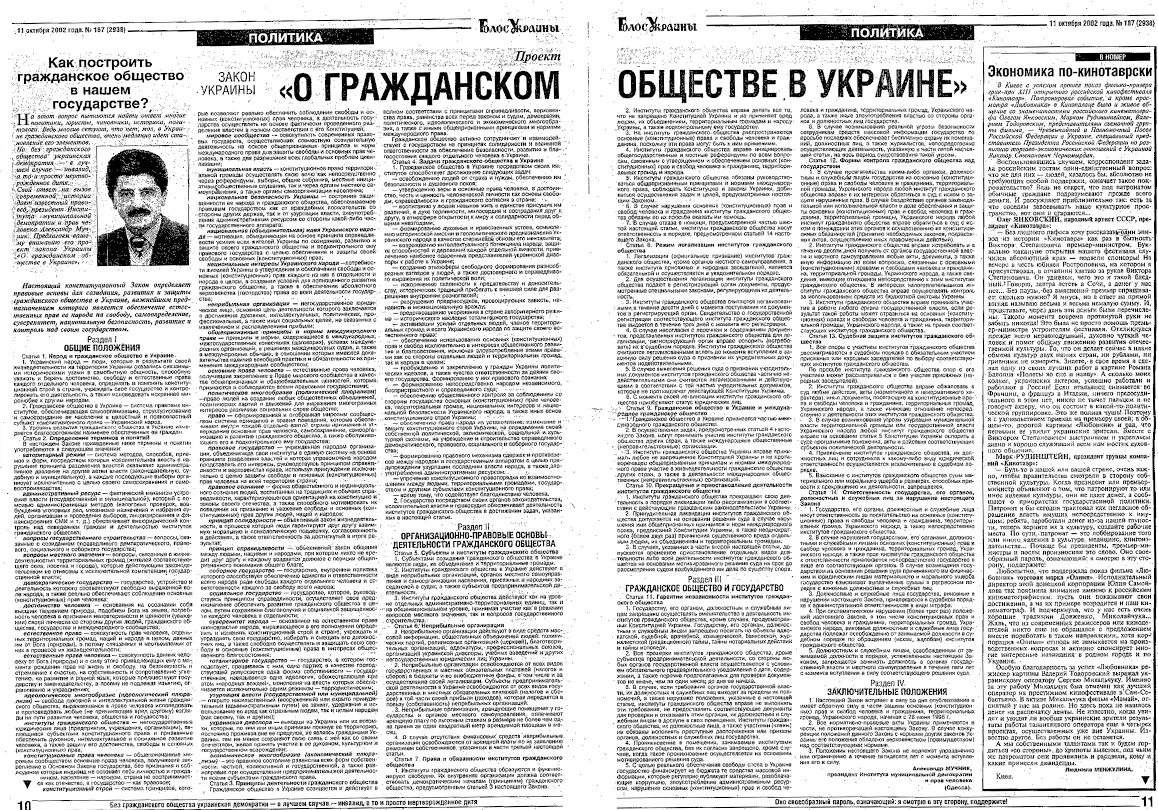
Draft Law of Ukraine "On the civil society in Ukraine" - newspaper "Golos Ukrainy», № 187 from 11.10.2002

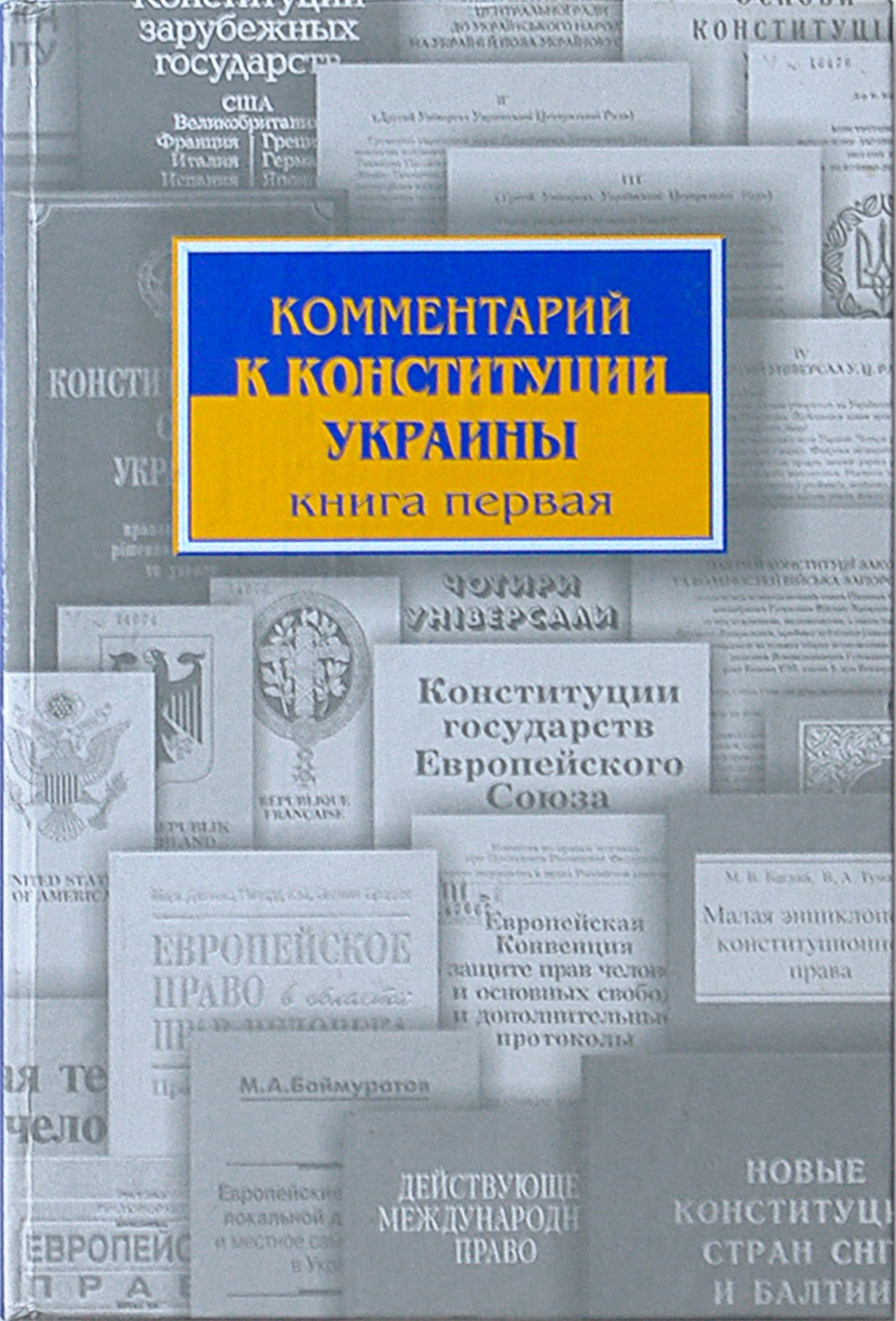
«Commentary on the Constitution of Ukraine" (Book I).

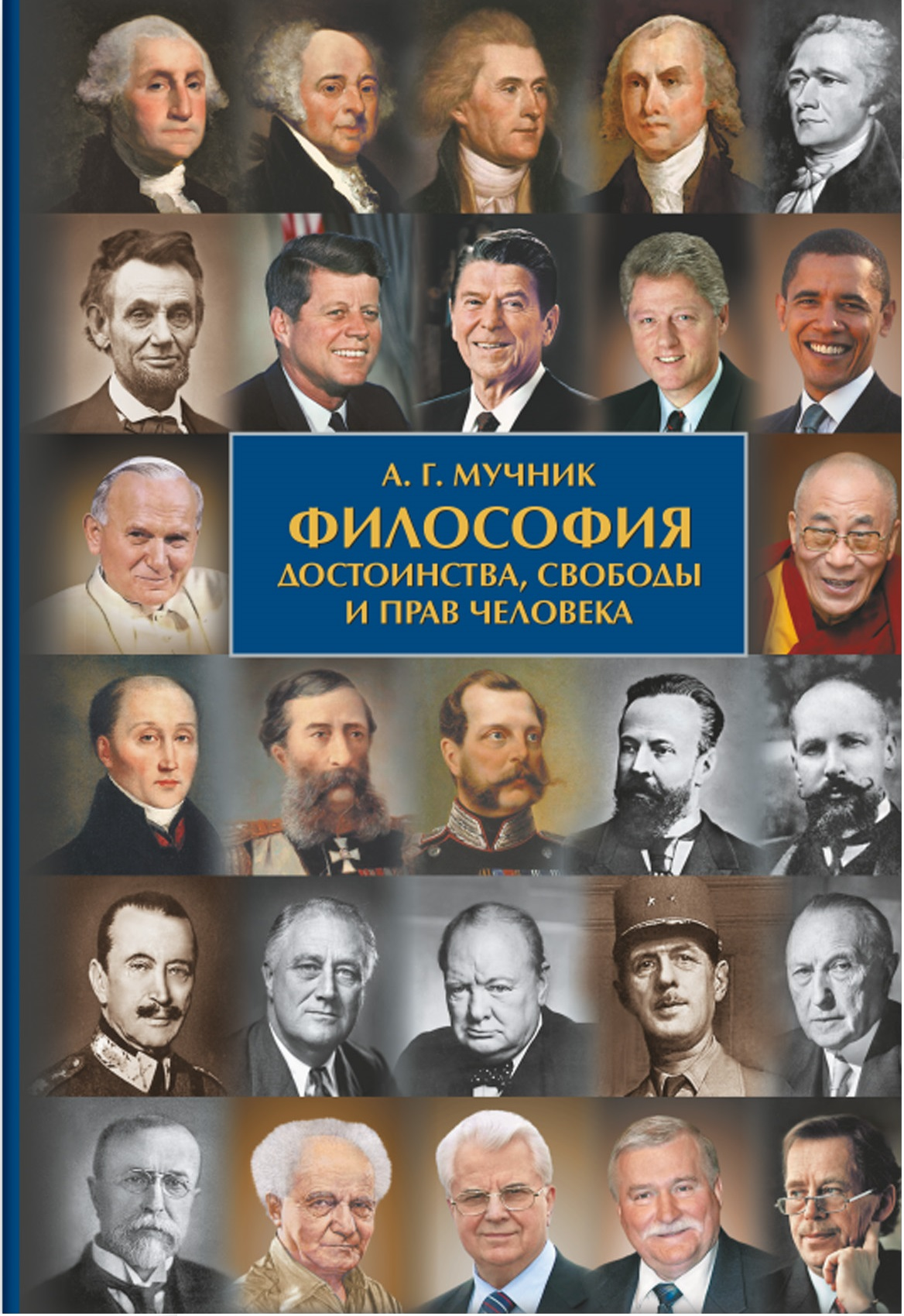
«Philosophy of dignity, freedom and human rights."

In 2000, in the Parliament Publishing House of the Supreme Council (Verkhovna Rada) of Ukraine under the auspices of the Institute appeared in print the first, and in 2003 - the second edition of the book "Commentary on the Constitution of Ukraine (Book one)", which was recommended by the Ministry of Education and Science of Ukraine as a textbook for students of higher educational institutions of Ukraine (Letter number 14 / 182-1270 from 16.07.2003). In the 2nd edition of the book the introductory speech to the readers was made by the second President of Ukraine Leonid Kuchma. With the purpose of legal education the book was donated to the libraries of Kiev schools (19.11.2003), higher educational institutions (19.11.2004) and the central governmental bodies of Ukraine.

In 2000, under the auspices of the Institute of International Law, there was released the textbook, authored by Doctor of Law, Professor, Honored Worker of Science and Technology of Ukraine, academician of the Ukrainian Academy of Sciences Mikhail Baimuratov.

In 2001 there was published developed by the Institute project of the Сonception of creating a free economic zone in the city of Odesa by gradual spreading of the legal regime of the European Union on the territory of Odesa as a form of integration of Ukraine into the EU;

In 2002, in the Official Publishing organ of the Parliament of Ukraine there was published developed by the Institute draft project of the Law of Ukraine "On civil society in Ukraine".

In 2009, in the Parliament Publishing House of the Supreme Council (Verkhovna Rada) of Ukraine under the auspices of the Institute appeared in print the book "Philosophy of dignity, freedom and human rights". The book got through two editions. The foreword to the 2nd edition of the book was written by the first President of Ukraine Leonid Kravchuk and the reviewers were: Director of the Institute of National Security Problems of Ukraine, academician of the National Academy of Sciences of Ukraine Gorbulin V.P. and Director of the Institute of Legislation of the Supreme Council (Verkhovna Rada) of Ukraine, corresponding member of the NAS of Ukraine A. L. Kopylenko, the first rector of the Law Institute of the Odesa I.I.Mechnikov state university, Doctor of Law, academician of the Academy of Law of Ukraine A. S. Vasilyev, as well as Doctor of law, professor I.V. Postica. This book was donated to the libraries of a number of the best universities of Ukraine and the world, as well as the largest national libraries of Ukraine, Russia, the USA, the UK and Israel.

The staff of the Institute (January 2011) individually addressed the ambassadors of all Western countries in Ukraine and a number of the most famous international organizations concerned with the promotion of human rights and put forward the project of a national scale. The essence of the project was that several influential human rights organizations of Western countries would act as founders of the unified Ukrainian "parent" non-governmental organization on promotion of human rights (NGO), capable of ensuring in all the regions of Ukraine a rapid establishing, effective performance and reliable protection of an extensive network of "affiliates" of organizations of human rights promotion. It was supposed to involve decent, educated and motivated young lawyers selected on a competitive basis to carry out the mission of legal education and human rights protection on the basis of a unified coordinated methodological, cultural and legal, information-legal policy on the part of the "parent" NGO. Thus, it was assumed to create on the basis of the above-mentioned network of human rights protection organizations an infrastructure of a civil society in Ukraine. However, the letter was responded to by only one Embassy (the Embassy of Switzerland in Ukraine), a human rights organization from Australia and a mission of the Konrad Adenauer Fund in Ukraine. All the other addressees left the appeal of the Institute unanswered.

More than once the Institute team have given constitutional and legal conclusions at the request of the Constitutional Court of Ukraine.

On February 25, 2016 the Institute sent a written proposal to establish within Odesa Regional State Administration the post of a Commissioner on Human Rights with the purpose of organizing legal education, formation of legal culture and creating on the territory of the region a network of organizations to protect human rights and fundamental freedoms. The proposal was rejected.

On April 19, 2016 the Institute appealed to the Vice Prime Minister for European and Euro-Atlantic integration of Ukraine issues, the Committee on European Integration of the Supreme Council (Verkhovna Rada) of Ukraine and Odesa mayor with a written proposal to establish on an experimental basis unilaterally according to the international agreement concluded between the European Union and Ukraine, the legal regime of the EU in the city of Odesa, as the first stage of the European integration of Ukraine.

On November 8, 2017, the first President of Ukraine, L.M. Kravchuk, addressed the Ambassador of the Swiss Confederation in Ukraine with a request to assist the Institute in establishing contacts with Swiss colleagues with the aim of organizing cooperation in the integration of Ukraine into a unified European space. On February 12, 2018 the response of the Ambassador of the Swiss Confederation in Ukraine to the first President of Ukraine, L.M. Kravchuk was received.

== Legal education ==
In 2000 the Institute organized in the secondary schools of the city a discussion of the Draft of the Charter of the city of Odesa. High school students, who showed themselves in those debate, subsequently participated in television broadcasts dedicated to the discussion of Odesa Development Strategy.

From 2003 to 2006 the Institute team acted as organizers and coordinators of the project "Youth Council for Human Rights and Development of Civil Society", which operated with the participation of law students and higher education institutions of Ukraine under the auspices of the Administration of the President of Ukraine, the National Security and Defense Council of Ukraine, the National Institute for strategic studies under the President of Ukraine.

The most notable project of the Institute was a series of television programs (2011) with the participation of law students and Odesa universities dedicated to the constitutional and legal reform in Ukraine. The programs were broadcast on the satellite channel "OK" for several countries of the world. The first president of Ukraine Leonid Kravchuk addressed the audience of the first transmission with an opening speech; the second programme was opened by the ex-speaker of the Parliament of Ukraine Alexander Moroz, the fourth one – by the Chairman of the Central Election Committee of Ukraine V. Shapoval.

== Legal work ==
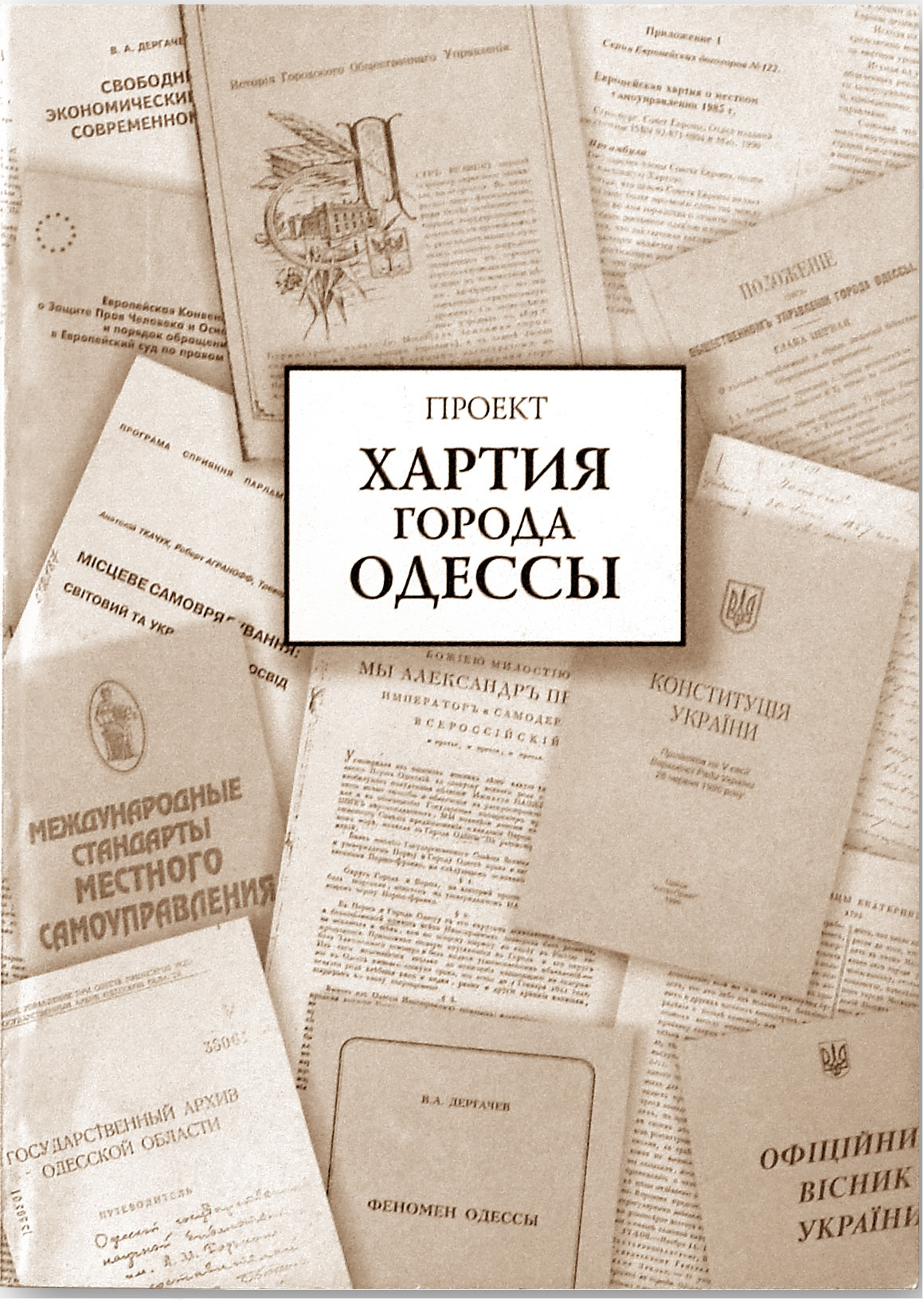
Draft Charter of Odesa.

A number of creative ideas, projects and concepts have been worked out in the process of the Institute activities, namely:

- the idea of the organization of local self-government in the city of Odesa taking into account the original history of the city (the city of Odesa Charter project);
- the idea of building a civil society in the country through publication of a special constitutional law (the Draft Law of Ukraine "On civil society in Ukraine");
- the idea of building a civil society in the country through publication of a special constitutional law (the Draft Law of Ukraine "On civil society in Ukraine");
- the concept of semi-presidential republic in Ukraine;
- the draft of the Constitution of Ukraine in the new edition;
- the system of categories, explaining the essence of the established in Ukraine economic system, system of government and political system ( "nomenclature oligarchy", "nomenclature privatization", "nomenclature capitalism", "nomenclature Law", "nomenclature rule of law", "quasi-state", "Ukrainian system ");
- the concept of constitutional political science;
- the concept of fictitiousness of the state - "quasi-state";
- the concept of "the culture of dignity";
- the version of confiscation of public property (national wealth) hidden by the euphemism of "state property privatization";
- the concept of nationalization of unlawfully confiscated public property;
- the concept of constitutionally- legal and judicial reforms in Ukraine;
- the concept of decency as a source of Law;
- the concept of the national idea.

== Links ==
- (Rus.) Baimuratov M.A. International Law: Textbook. - Kharkov: Odyssey, 2000. - 786 p. ISBN 966-633-074-1
- (Rus.) «Commentary on the Constitution of Ukraine" (Book I). - Kiev: Parliamentary publishing house, 2000 .; 2nd ed. Corrected. and ext. 2003- 400 c. - ISBN 966-611-252-3
- (Rus.) «Philosophy of dignity, freedom and human rights." - Kiev: Parliamentary Publishing, 2009-696 c. - ISBN 978-966-611-679-9
- (Ukr.) Melnik Y.V. "Maxim of an ideal state or concept of a constitutional reform" // journal "Ukrainskiy chasopis mіzhnarodnogo prava" number 3/2014, sec. 151-157
- (Eng.) Muchnik L.A. "Raoul Wallenberg: the duel with Stalin!"
