= Janusz Korczak Institute =

Medical charity

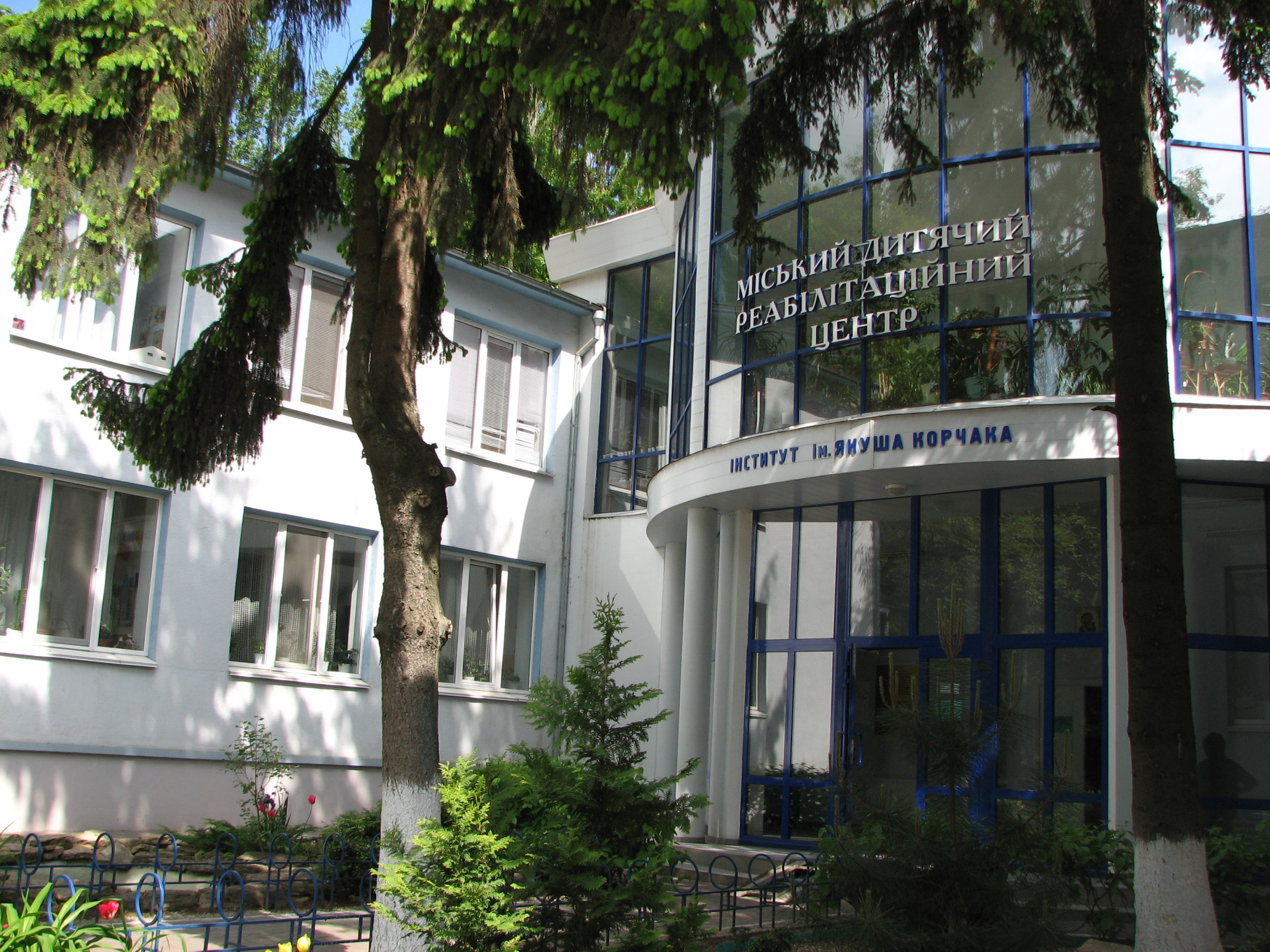
The office of Janusz Korczak Institute

The Janusz Korczak Institute of Medical Rehabilitation of Children with Central Nervous System Lesion is a non-governmental charity establishment that provides medical care to disabled children with various forms of organic lesions and functional disorders of the brain.

It was established by Dr. Haass Social Assistance Fund on June 9, 1989 on the initiative of Oleg Kutateladze and Alexander Muchnik.

== History ==
The institute was named in memory of the Polish teacher, writer, physician and public figure Janusz Korczak The official estimate of the Institute's activities was reflected in the Conclusion of the Standing Committee on Social Policy of the Odesa City Council on May 17, 2000.

On November 26, 2005 its name was changed for Janusz Korczak Institute for rehabilitation of persons with disabilities in the psycho-physical development.

Since the establishment of the Institute the head of the Institute has been Doctor of Medical Sciences, professor, an expert of the United Nations Children's Fund Irina Viktorovna Galina.

== Medical activity ==
For the time of its activity the Institute has treated more than 12 thousand people with intellectual disability, cerebral palsy, autism and other forms of organic lesions and functional disorders of the brain.

The Institute carries out a comprehensive rehabilitation of the disabled, including the author's methods developed by the staff of the Institute.

In 2000, a city basic center for social rehabilitation of children with disabilities was established on the basis of the Institute. There is a department of early rehabilitation, a kindergarten, a group of day care and education, a training group and a specialized workshop where 40 disabled people obtain labor skills and working sites in it.

In 2014 the Institute opened the first in Ukraine social hostel for adults with special needs. The hostel is designed for permanent supported accommodation of 12 disabled people of both sexes. In the hostel there is a crisis center for two seats for a temporary stay of a disabled person in case of illness of parents / guardians, need for their temporary absence or other situation.

With the help of the Institute the rehabilitation centers, centers of early rehabilitation, vocational training have been created in Bolgrad, Reni, Belgorod-Dnestrovsky. The Institute assists in the training and professional skills improvement of employees, providing them with the necessary equipment and teaching aids for children and methodical literature.

== Partnerships ==
The Institute has long-term partnerships with foreign organizations working in this field. The partners are the Society of Friends of Dr. Haas, Germany, German National League of assistance to persons with mental retardation LEBENSHILFE, the Association of assistance companies to the disabled with intellectual disabilities ADAPEI AM, France, and others.

== Links ==
- Website of Janusz Korczak Institute
- Video: There is nothing of this kind even in Europe
- «Quick as the breeze from Armin Arendt» — Newspaper "Yug", 76 (15829) // 4 November 2008
