= Dr. Haass Social Assistance Fund =

Charity organisation

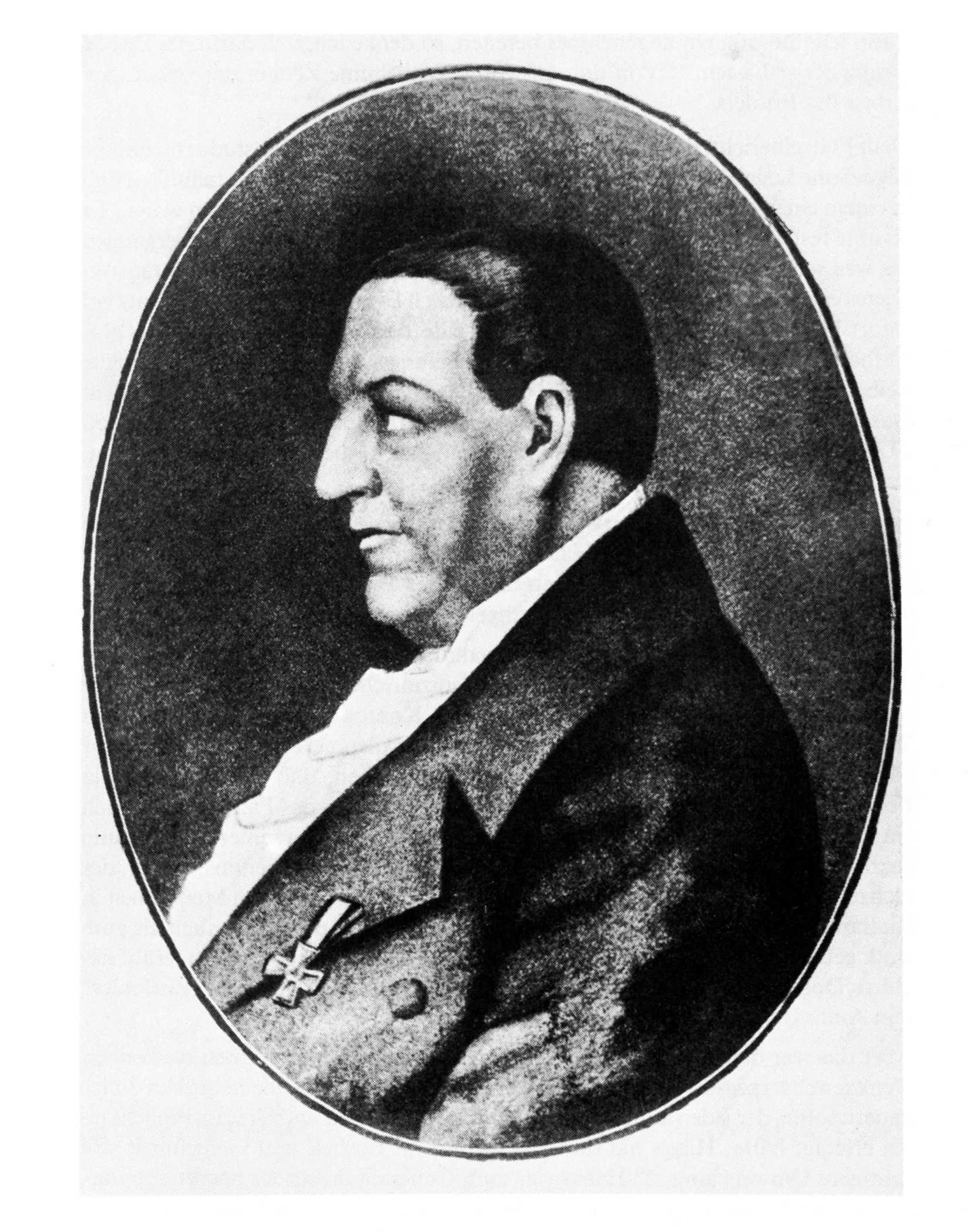
"Saint Doctor", Friedrich Joseph Haass

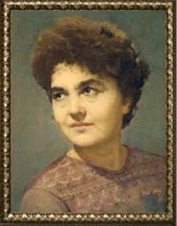
The first chairman of the boardof the Fund Tamara Tarasenko. Painter L.L. Gormakh

Dr. Haass Social Assistance Fund is the first non-profitable non-governmental charitable organization (NPO) in the Soviet Union, founded on November 26, 1987, in Odessa (USSR). It is named after a famous Russian philanthropist, "Saint Doctor", Friedrich Joseph Haass (1780–1853).

The most comprehensive official study of diverse charitable activities of the Fund has found its documentary reflection in the report of the Standing Committee on Social Policy of the Odesa City Council on May 17, 2000 as well as in the documentary film about the activity of the Fund Independent experts of the Standing Committee estimated the Fund charitable assistance to people in need, and to social institutions, at a total amount of more than eight million US dollars, as of 2000.

== History ==
Graduates of the Faculty of Law of Odessa State Mechnikov University (OSU) Oleg Kutateladze and Alexander Muchnik were the founders of the Fund. OSU professors supported the creation and formation of the fund: the head of the department of philosophy Tamara Tarasenko (1939–1992), who became the first chairman of the board of the fund, and the Dean of the Faculty of Law, Doctor of Law, professor, Academician Anatoly S. Vasilyev (1938–2015), who became a member of the Board of the Fund.

== Charity ==
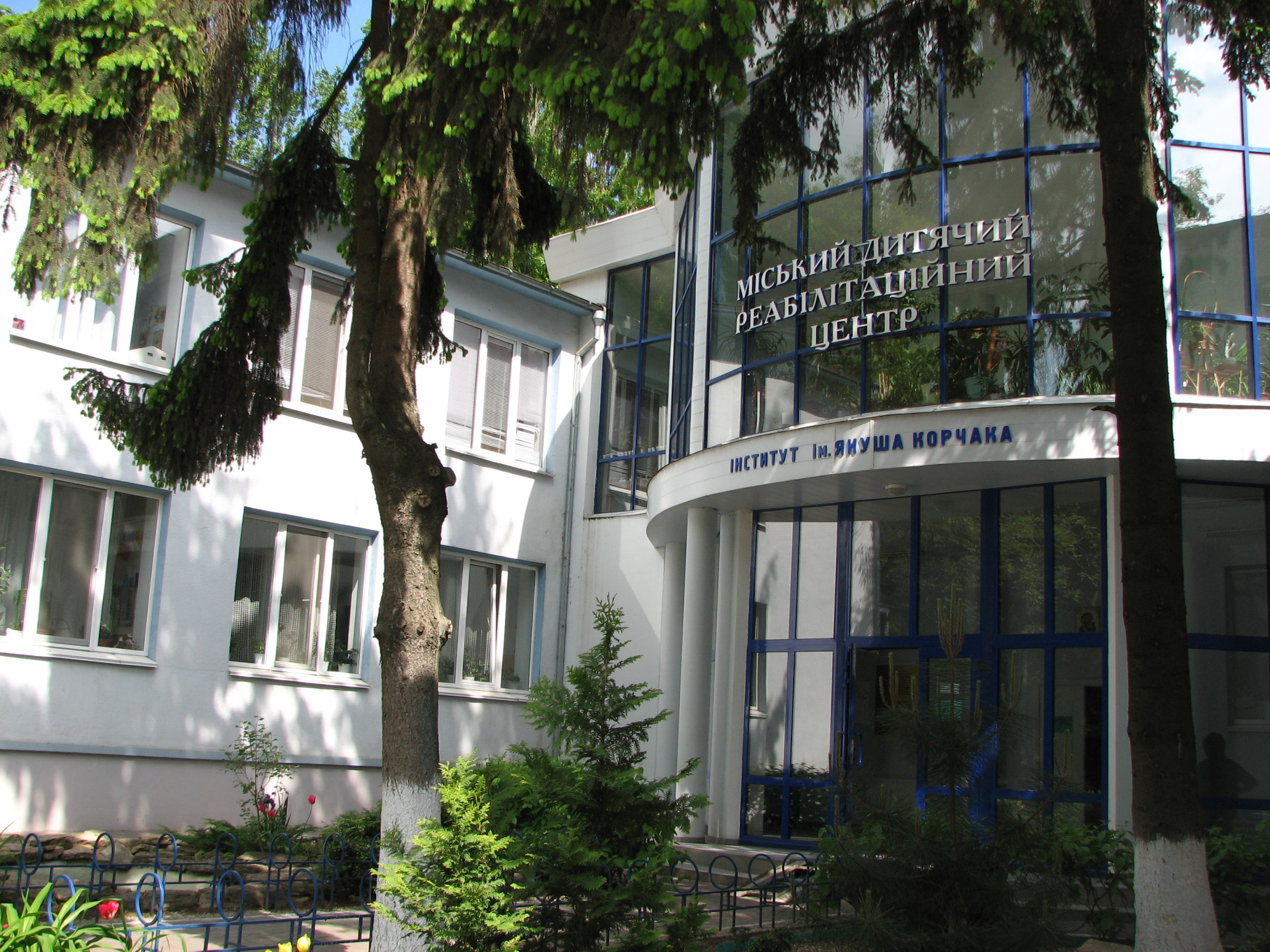
The office of Janusz Korczak Institute

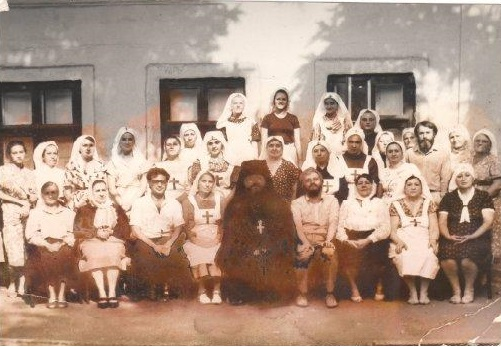
The staff of the Mother Maria Mercy Center

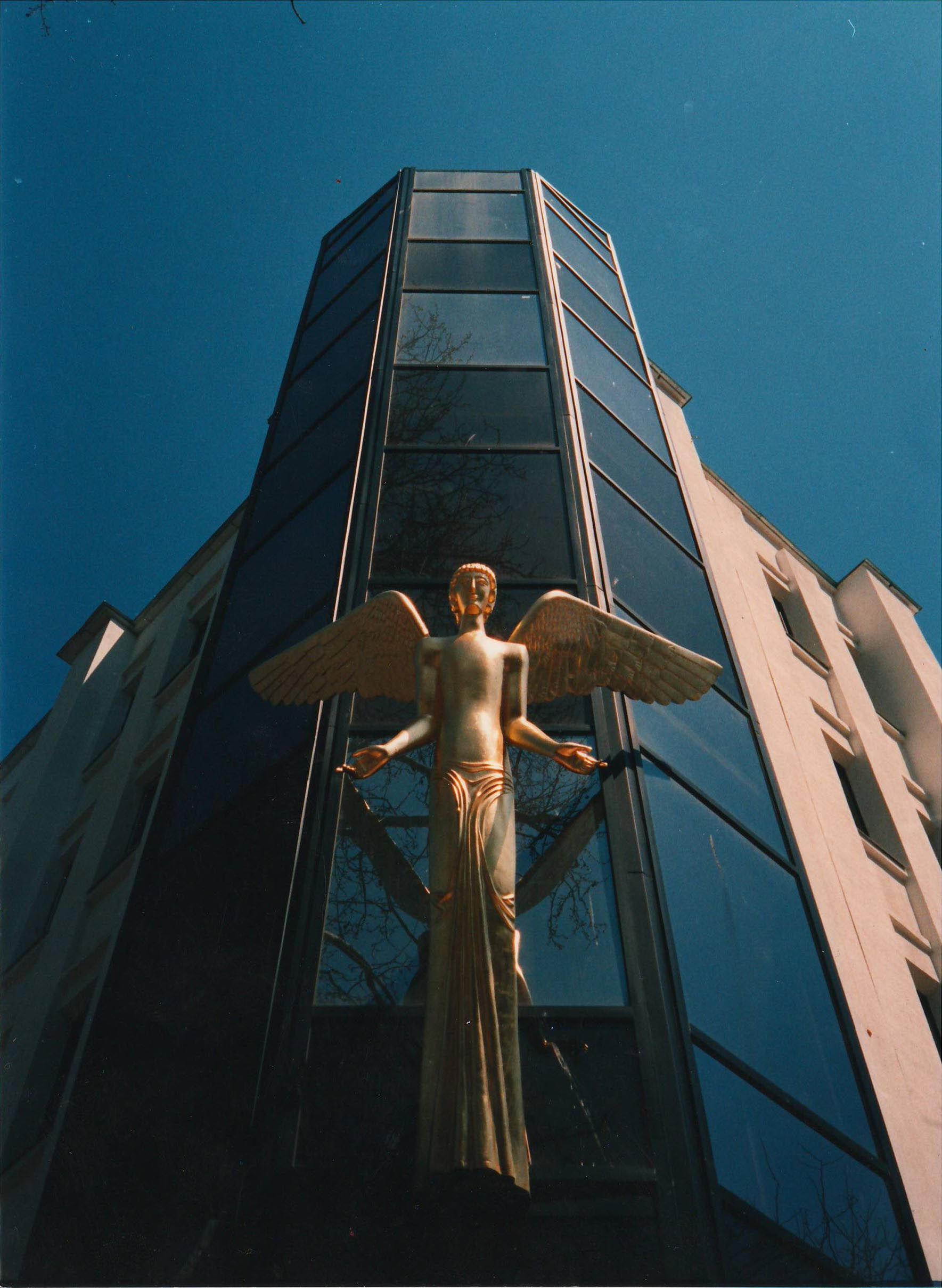
House with the angel

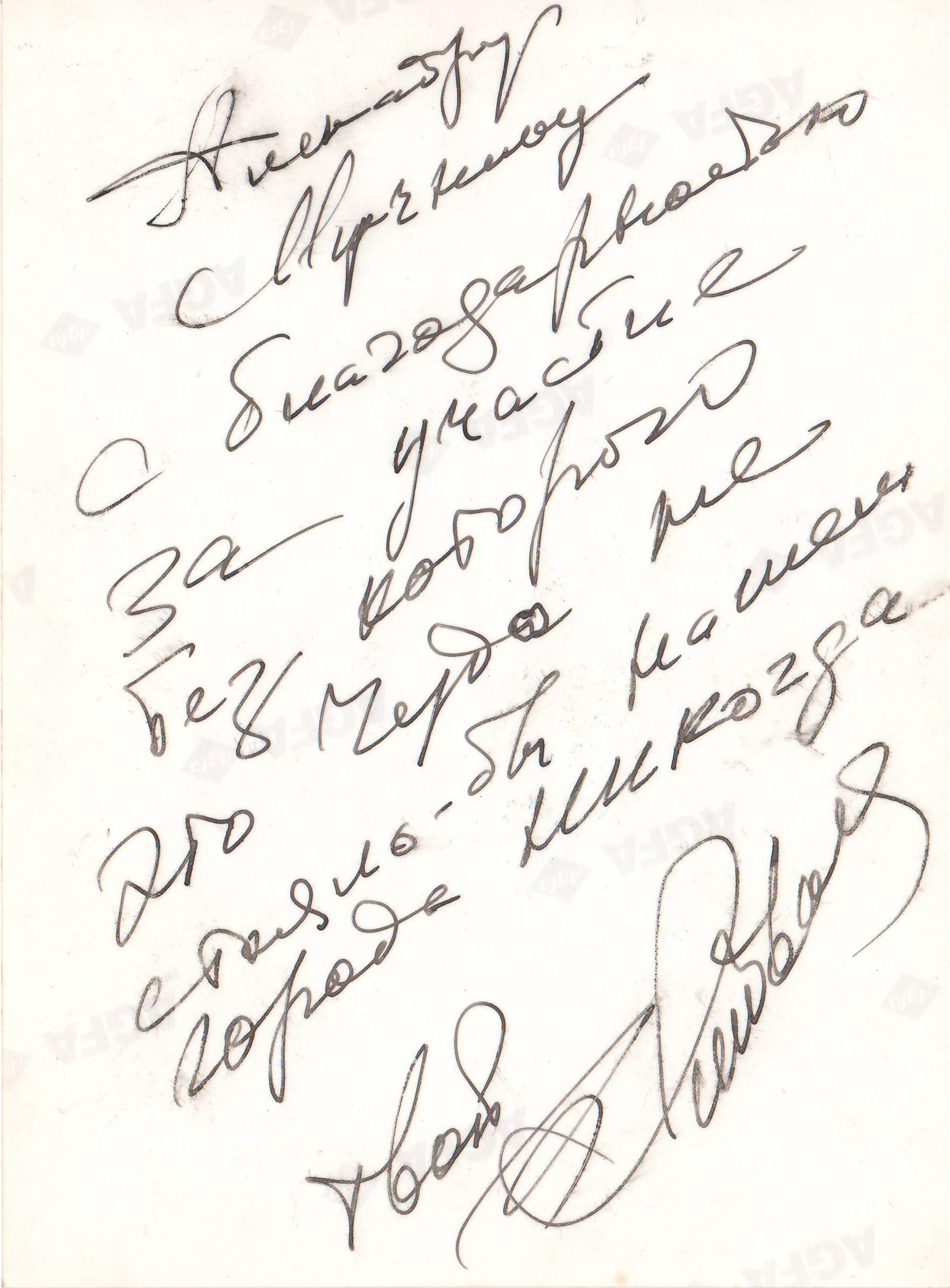
Autograph of the Hero of Ukraine Boris Litvak ("To Alexander Muchnik with gratitude for participation without which this wonderful center would have never been created. Sincerely yours, Boris Litvak")

During its philanthropic mission the Fund has created and funded a number of charitable organizations and programs that provide social, medical and psychological assistance to a large number of lonely elderly people, disabled people, war and labor veterans, sick children, as well as financial support to kindergartens, schools, hospitals and health centers, various social institutions.

It is one of the participants of the inaugural conference of the Soviet Charity and Health Fund (September 16, 1988, Moscow, the USSR).

To prepare the establishment of a free economic zone in Odessa on November 23, 1988, the Fund commissioned a group of economists led by Professor Vladimir Dergachyov, to develop the documents entitled "Prospects of Odessa region on the basis of an open economy", which was delivered to the Fund on April 6, 1989 р.

The Fund founded Janusz Korczak Institute of medical rehabilitation of children with central nervous system lesion (September 6, 1989, Odessa, the Ukrainian SSR). For many years Doctor of Medicine, professor, UNICEF expert Irina Viktorovna Galina has been the leader of the institute. During its activity the institute has treated more than 12 thousand children with organic and functional diseases of the central nervous system, such as cerebral palsy, intellectual disability, Down syndrome, epilepsy, and autism.

Mother Maria Mercy Center (August 9, 1989, Odessa, the USSR). In its three hospitals, located in Odessa (in Gamarnik street, 13, apt 14; Prospect Mira, 37; and Tereshkova street, 12 "b" apt 21), highly qualified doctors and nurses, under the guardiance of PhD Borys Khersonskyi at the beginning and later by Vladimir Gemusov (1939–2014), took care of elderly lonely people. The center staff also provided medical care and social protection to elderly lonely people at home. Two ambulance cars served the centre.

Youth Charitable Institution "Humanist" (May 15, 1990, Odessa, the USSR), which with the active participation of high-school students and students of Odessa secondary and higher educational medical institutions, under the leadership of Lyubov Bogomolova,[20] regularly provided social, medical and psychological care for elderly people who live alone. Two ambulance cars served the elderly people.

The fund responded to individual requests for support from persons and organizations deserving consideration, namely:

- Supported solo exhibition of paintings be an Odessa artist Zoya Ivnytskaya in Western Berlin, FRG (October 1989 – January 1990);
- Provided the necessary support to an Odessa pianist Sergei Terentyev (1990, Odessa, the Ukrainian SSR);
- Provided financial assistance to the newspaper "Moscow News", whose office was damaged by the fire (March 14, 1990, Moscow, the USSR);
- Provided financial assistance to the famous Soviet dissident and human rights activist Valery Abramkyn "Humanization of the prison system" (April 23, Moscow, the USSR);
- Provided financial assistance to the first hospice in the Soviet Union (September 26, 1990, Leningrad, the USSR);
- Provided financial support to the Institute for Economic Strategies (October 17, 1990, Moscow, the USSR).

The Fund founded Center for Psychological and Social Support (November 15, 1990, Odessa, the USSR), including youth service helpline, under the supervision of a physician Leopold Mendelson. Every night it provided emergency psychological assistance to young people who found themselves in difficult life situations. Center initiated the creation of the Association of hotlines (1990), the Ukrainian association of telephone consultants (1992), as well as the International Workshop telephone consultants.

For training the staff for charitable and social institutions at the Richelieu Lyceum College the Fund created Philanthropic college named after Alexander Men on the base of Richelieu Lyceum (January 1, 1990, Odessa, the Ukrainian SSR). The head of it was a teacher of Mathematics from the Lyceum Dora Chorokayeva.

Along with the building concern "Primorskiy" (Yuriy Kulbachenko) the Fund organized the program of free renovation of apartments of poor lonely elderly people. The programme was carried out under the guidance of an experienced builder Vladimir Anenberg (1921–2004).

It created the first in the country financial company – Joint-stock financial investment company "Fund" (May 7, 1991, Odessa, the Ukrainian SSR) – which was designed to operate on the principles of philanthropic business. Charitable and social organizations became its stockholders.

On January 26, 1991, together with the newspaper "Vechernyaya Odessa" the Fund appealed to all citizens of Odessa, non-governmental organizations, labor groups, government bodies, people's deputies and their councils to create a necessary social citywide programme "Miloserdiye" (Mercy) to ensure social assistance for each person in need

The Fund initiated the establishment of the Association of Charitable organizations in Odessa (October 16, 1991). Its government was to be formed of journalists, in order to promote the process of establishment, operation and protection of charitable organizations, willing to work in Odessa.

The Fund represented by the Head Alexander Muchnik contributed to the creation of the Center for Rehabilitation of Disabled Children "Maibutnye" (Future), better known as the "House with the angel".

The fund financed the treatment of a cancer patient at the Medical Center "Cyber Clinic of Spizhenko." (September 17, 2014; September 24, 2015; October 9, 2015).

== International relationships ==
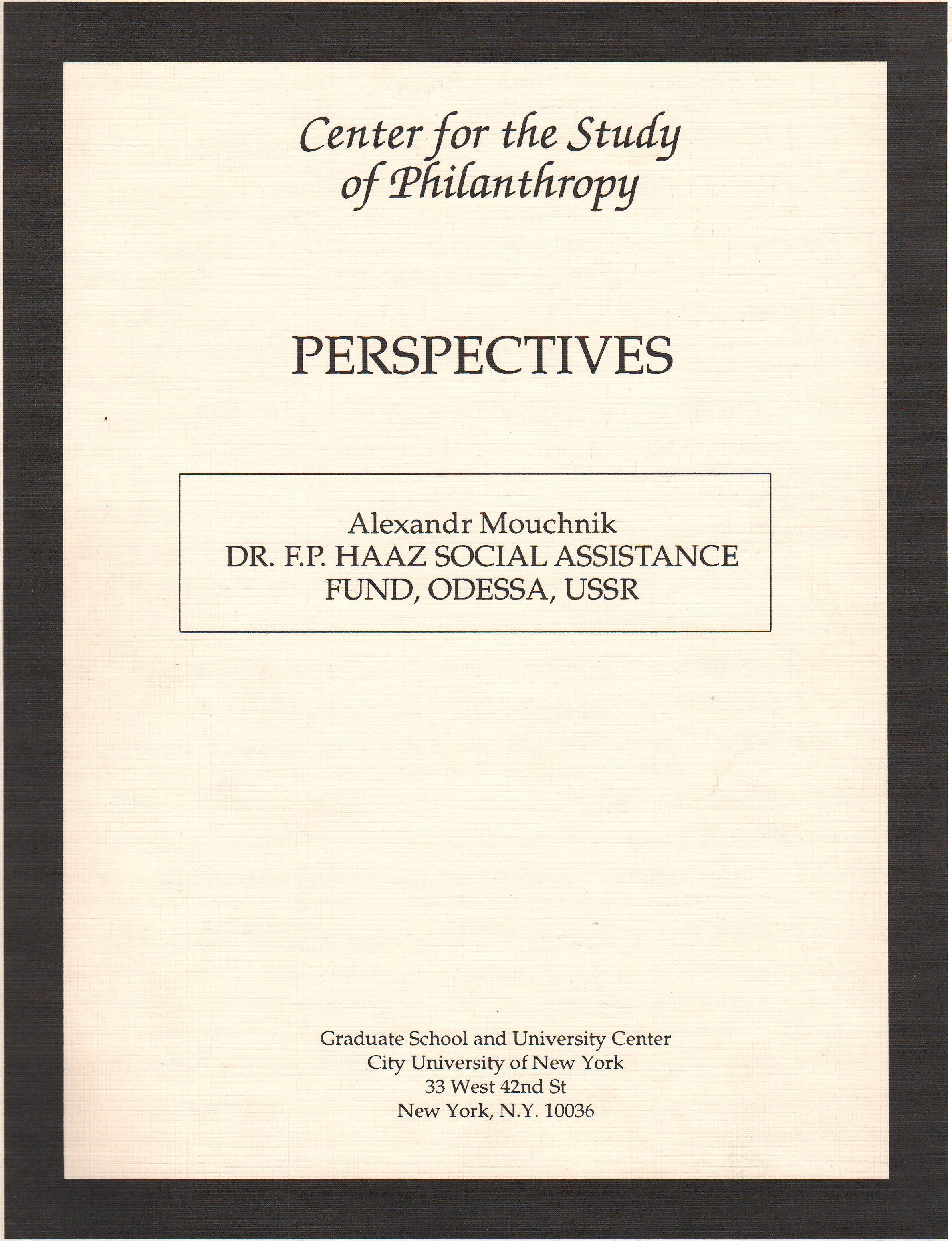
Brochure about Dr. Haass Social Assistance Fund (1991, New York City)

The Fund organized the first in the country international conference of charitable organizations "Kindness and peace" ( October 4–7, 1990, Odessa, the Ukrainian SSR).

Fruitful activity of the Fund fairly quickly gained international recognition.

On May 28, 1991, A. G. Muchnik made a presentation on the history and activities of the Fund in the Center for the Study of Philanthropy (New York City, United States), and a brochure was published by the centre and distributed among the US charitable organizations.

On July 15, 1991, Muchnik gave a presentation on the activities of the Fund in the United Nations Office at Vienna Centre for Social Development and Humanitarian Affairs (Vienna, Austria).

On November 24–29, 1992 Dr Haaz Social Assistance Fund sent Hero of Ukraine Boris Litvak as the president of the Fund to a seminar of the UN Department in Vienna. On June 3, 1993, Head of the Department of the UN in Vienna Henry Sokalski sent a letter to the president of Dr Haaz Social Assistance Fund, with a statement of full support from his part, and calling for future sponsors to assist the project of Children's rehabilitation center in Odessa.

The Partner is the Society of friends of Dr. F.J. Haass (Bad Münstereifel, Germany).

== The Fund in mass media ==
- "Co-operatives to mercy service".- Newspaper "Izvestiya", February 9, 1988
- "Hasten to do good things!". – Journal "Rabotnitsa", No. 3,1989
- "Dr Haass Social Assistance Fund". – Newspaper "Nedelya", No. 49, 1989
- "To die according to the instruction". – Newspaper "Trud", January 24, 1990
- "Instruction instead of soul ". – Newspaper "Trud", March 3, 1990
- "Dr Haass Fund". – Newspaper "Novorossiyskiy telegraph" No. 1, 1990
- "People, money, conscience". – Journal "Okhrana truda i socialnogo strakhovaniya" No. 7, 1990
- "The pass-word of mercy is Dr Haass". – Newspaper "Vechernyaya Odessa", June 3, 1991
- "Save our souls". – Newspaper "Odesskiy polytekhnik", October 18, 1991
- "Harbourage of hope". – Newspaper "Vechernyaya Odessa", November 20, 1991
- "Humanists". – Newspaper "Vechernyaya Odessa", April 7, 1992
- "Letters from Dr Haass Fund". – Newspaper "Vechernyaya Odessa", December 5, 1995
- "Who cares for you, old people?". – Newspaper "Odesskiye izvestiya", March 22, 1996
- "For whom the bell tolls?". – Newspaper "Odesskiy vestnik", December 3, 1998
- "The island of welfare". – Newspaper "Odesskiy vestnik", December 24, 1998
- "How we learned to donate beggars". – Newspaper "Yug", November 23, 2002
- "Hasten to do good things…". – Newspaper "Vechernyaya Odessa", November 26, 2002
- "Rebound". – Newspaper "Odesskiye izvestiya", December 4, 2002
- "Forgotten lessons of the past instead of a preface – Newspaper "Odesski visti", November 14, 2015
- "A Portrait of a Human Rights Activist in the Social Interior" – Newspaper "2000", No. 9, March 2, 2016
