= Yuliya Tarasenko =

Yuliya Tarasenko or Yulia Tarasenko may refer to

- Yuliya Tarasenko (orienteer) (born 1984), Russian ski-orienteering athlete
- Yuliya Tarasenko (gymnast) (born 1985), Belarusian gymnast
