= Oleksandr Tarasenko =

Oleksandr Tarasenko may refer to:

- Oleksandr Tarasenko (footballer, born 1978), Ukrainian football defender
- Oleksandr Tarasenko (footballer, born 1985), Ukrainian football midfielder
- Oleksandr Tarasenko (basketball) (born 1996), Ukrainian basketball player
