= Andrey Tarasenko =

Andrey or Andrei Tarasenko may refer to:

- Andrei Tarasenko (ice hockey) (1968–2024), Russian ice hockey player
- Andrey Tarasenko (powerlifter) (born 1975), Russian powerlifter
- Andrey Tarasenko (politician) (born 1963), Russian politician
