= Alexander Muchnik =

Ukrainian human rights activist (born 1954)

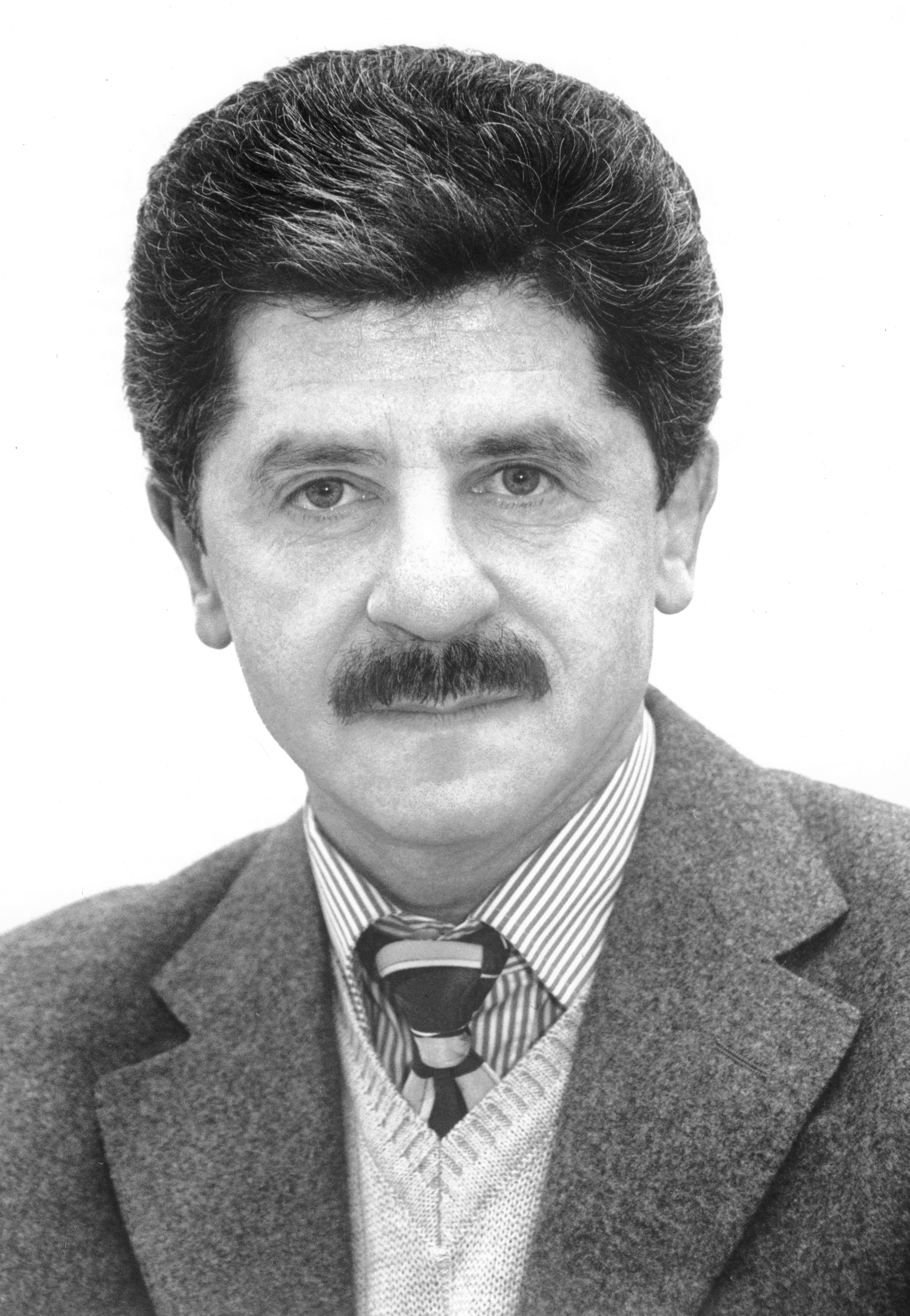
- Born: May 10, 1954 (age 72); Odesa, USSR
- Occupations: lawyer, activist, journalist
- Known for: President of the Institute of Democracy and Human Rights, Ukraine

Alexander Muchnik (Russian: Александр Геннадьевич Мучник; Ukrainian: Олександр Геннадійович Мучник; born May 10, 1954, in Odesa, USSR) is a lawyer, human rights activist and journalist.

He is a founder and the president of the Dr. Haass Social Assistance Fund, which was the first non-profit non-governmental charitable organization in the Soviet Union.

He is also the president of the Institute of Democracy and Human Rights.

== Education ==
In 1981, Muchnik graduated with honors from the Faculty of Law, Ilya Mechnikov State University of Odesa (now Odesa I. I. Mechnikov National University).

His research is in the fields of constitutional law, philosophy of law, theory and history of state and law of the Soviet Union, organization of public authority.

== Professional activity ==
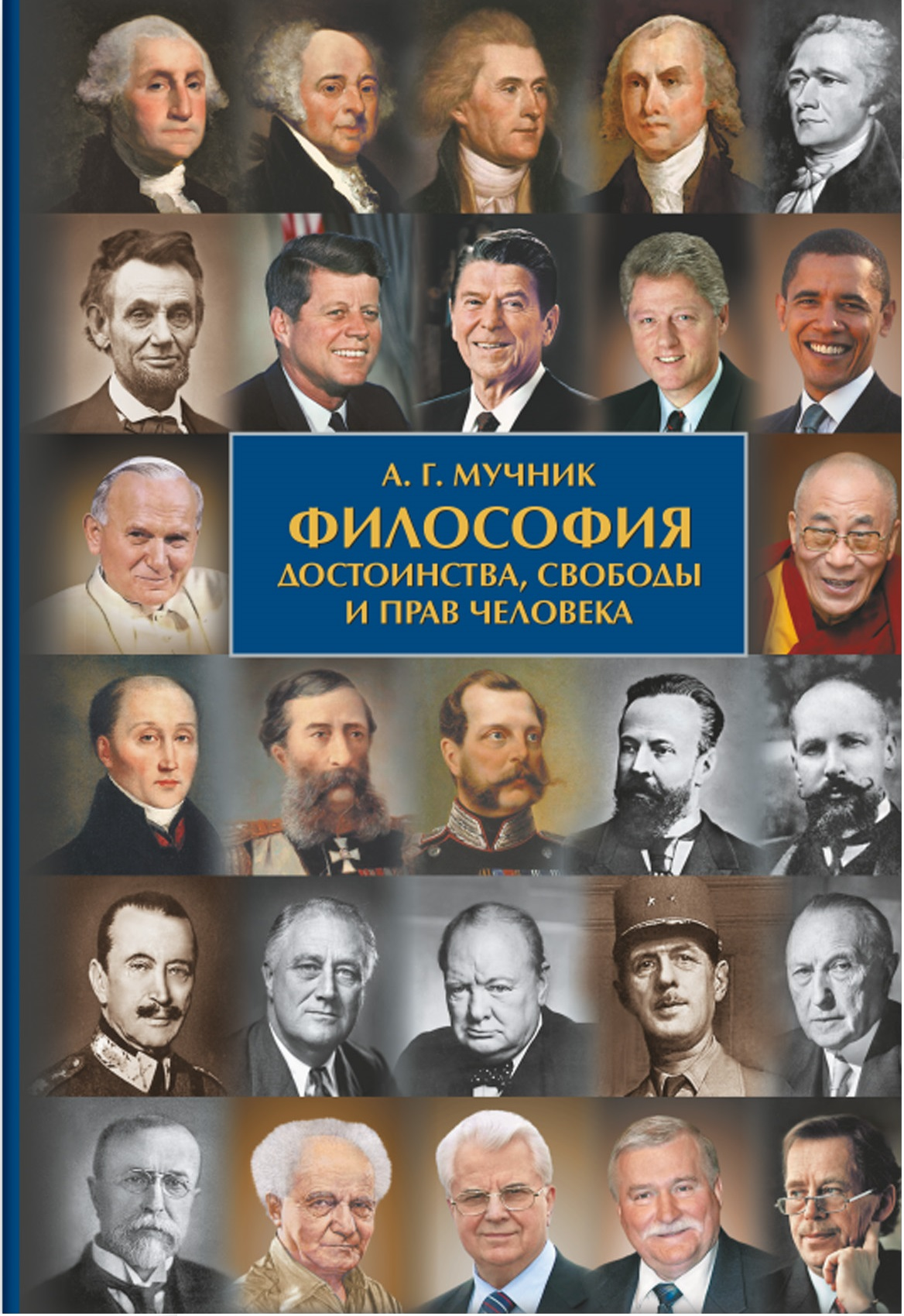
Book - "Philosophy of dignity, freedom and human rights"

Muchnik is the President of the Institute of Democracy and Human Rights.

In 2002, he was appointed as an adviser to the Prime Minister of Ukraine.

He was also Scientific Advisor on human rights and constitutional law to the President of Ukraine from 2002 to 2005.

In 2005, he was appointed as an adviser to the Secretary of National Security and Defense Council of Ukraine.

He is an Honored Lawyer of Ukraine.

He has authored several books, including Philosophy of dignity, freedom and human rights and Commentary on the Constitution of Ukraine (Book One).

He has also written on the concepts of constitutional political science, semi-presidential republic in Ukraine, and constitutional reform in Ukraine

Among his other projects are the Charter of the city of Odesa, Law of Ukraine "On civil society in Ukraine", a new edition of the Constitution of Ukraine; a number of comments on the fundamental rights of the Universal Declaration of Human Rights; and brochures about the Dr. Haass Social Assistance Fund (1991, New York, US).

== Charity ==
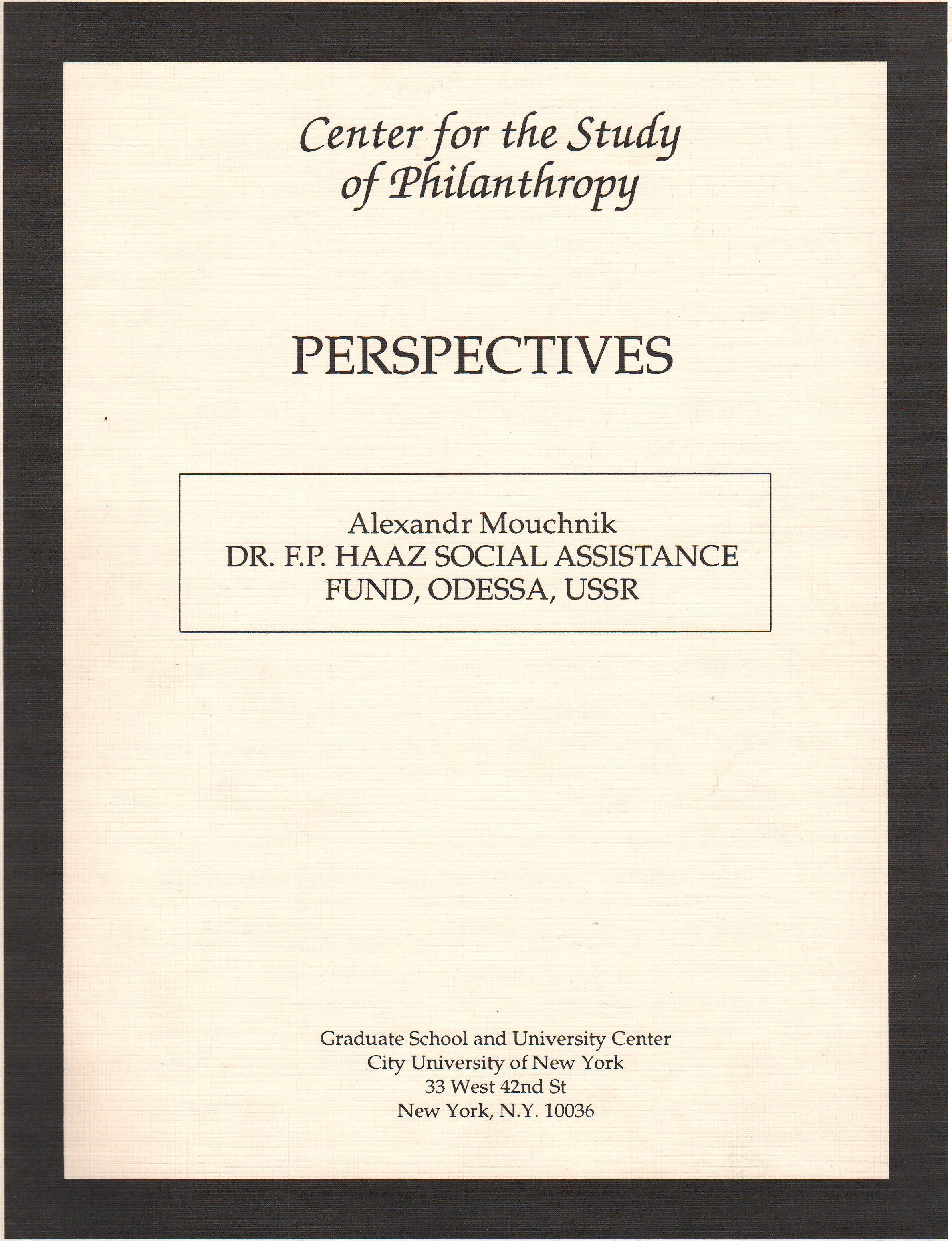
Brochure about Dr. Haass Social Assistance Fund (1991, New York, USA)

Muchnik was the founder of the first non-governmental charitable organization in the Soviet Union, the Dr. Haass Social Assistance Fund.

He was one of the founders of the Janusz Korczak Institute of medical rehabilitation of children with central nervous system lesion

He was assisted by Boris Litvak in the creation of the Center for Rehabilitation of Disabled Children "The Future", better known as the "House with an angel".

== International activity ==
On May 28, 1991, Alexander Muchnik made a presentation on the history and activities of the Dr. Haass Social Assistance Fund in the Center for the Study of Philanthropy (New York City, United States), and a Brochure was published by the centre and distributed among the US charitable organizations.

On July 15, 1991, Muchnik gave a presentation on the activities of the Fund in the United Nations Office at Vienna Centre for Social Development and Humanitarian Affairs (Vienna, Austria).

== Journalistic activities ==
He has many publications in Ukrainian media,. and is recognized as a founder of juridical publicism in Ukraine.
