= Felix Tarasenko =

Russian mathematician (1932–2021)

- Born: Felix Petrovich Tarasenko; 6 March 1932; Saratov, Russian SFSR
- Died: 1 January 2021 (aged 88); Tomsk, Russia
- Occupation: Mathematician

Felix Petrovich Tarasenko (6 March 1932 – 1 January 2021) was a Russian mathematician. He attended Tomsk State University and was one of the founders of the theory of systems analysis.

== Distinctions ==
- Jubilee Medal "In Commemoration of the 100th Anniversary of the Birth of Vladimir Ilyich Lenin" (1969)
