= Heorhiy Tarasenko =

Ukrainian military personnel (1996–2022)

- Георгій Тарасенко
- Born: December 6, 1996; Kharkiv, Ukraine
- Died: March 25, 2022 (aged 25) near Kharkiv, Ukraine
- Military career
- Allegiance: Ukraine
- Branch: Ukrainian Ground Forces
- Service years: 2014-2022
- Rank: Junior lieutenant
- Unit: Freikorps
- Conflicts: Russo-Ukrainian War; War in Donbas; Russian invasion of Ukraine †
- Awards: Order of the Gold Star (posthumously)

Heorhiy Oleksandrovych Tarasenko (Ukrainian: Георгій Олександрович Тарасенко; 6 December 1996, Kharkiv – 25 March 2022, near Kharkiv) was a Ukrainian activist, leader and commander of the volunteer unit "Freikorps", participant in the Russian-Ukrainian war, Hero of Ukraine (17 April 2022, posthumously), who died during the Russian invasion of Ukraine in 2022.

The first volunteer to be awarded Ukraine's highest rank since the beginning of the Russian invasion of Ukraine in 2022.

== Biography ==
Born in 1996 in the city of Kharkiv. Took an active part in the Revolution of Dignity, resisted the spread of the "Russian Spring" in Kharkiv. With the beginning of hostilities in eastern Ukraine in the spring of 2014, he went to the front and fought in Donetsk region.

In May 2017, he created and headed the "Fraykor" volunteer unit. With the beginning of the full-scale Russian invasion of Ukraine, Heorhiy Tarasenko, together with fellow employees of the volunteer unit "Fraykor", came to the defense of Kharkiv.

Tarasenko died on March 25, 2022, in Kharkiv Oblast during a counteroffensive near Kharkiv.

== Awards ==
On 17 April 2022, he was awarded the highest national title of Ukraine, Hero of Ukraine, with Order of the Gold Star.
