= Freikorps (Ukraine) =

- Фрайкор
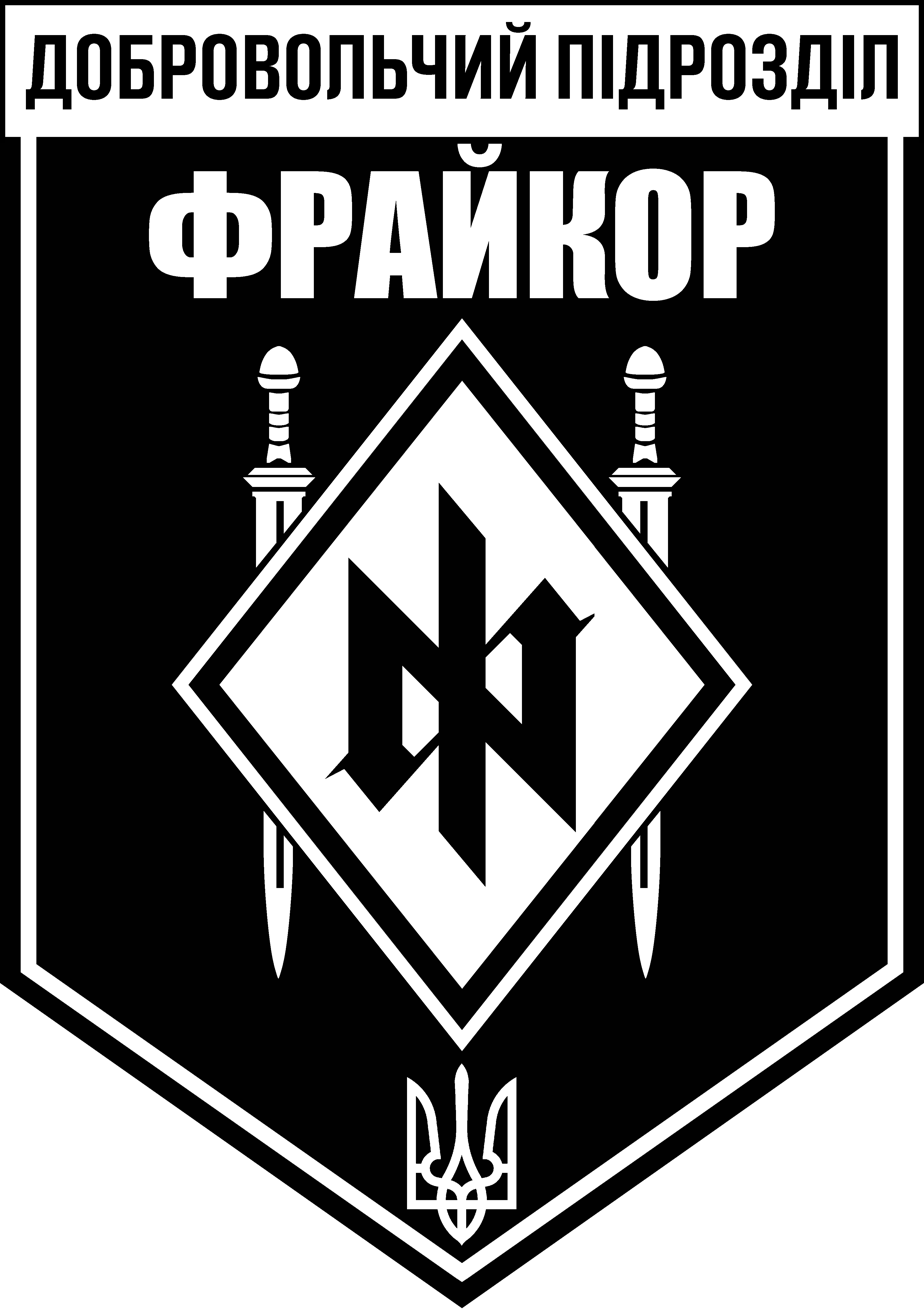
- Founded: July 13, 2017 – present
- Country: Ukraine
- Type: Paramilitary organization
- Role: Infantry
- Size: 80 - 250
- Garrison/HQ: Kharkiv
- Motto: Fortune Favors the Brave
- Engagements: Russo-Ukrainian War; War in Donbass; Russian invasion of Ukraine; Battle of Kharkiv; 2022 Kharkiv counteroffensive; 2024 Kharkiv offensive

Commanders
- Notable commanders: Heorhiy Tarasenko †

Insignia
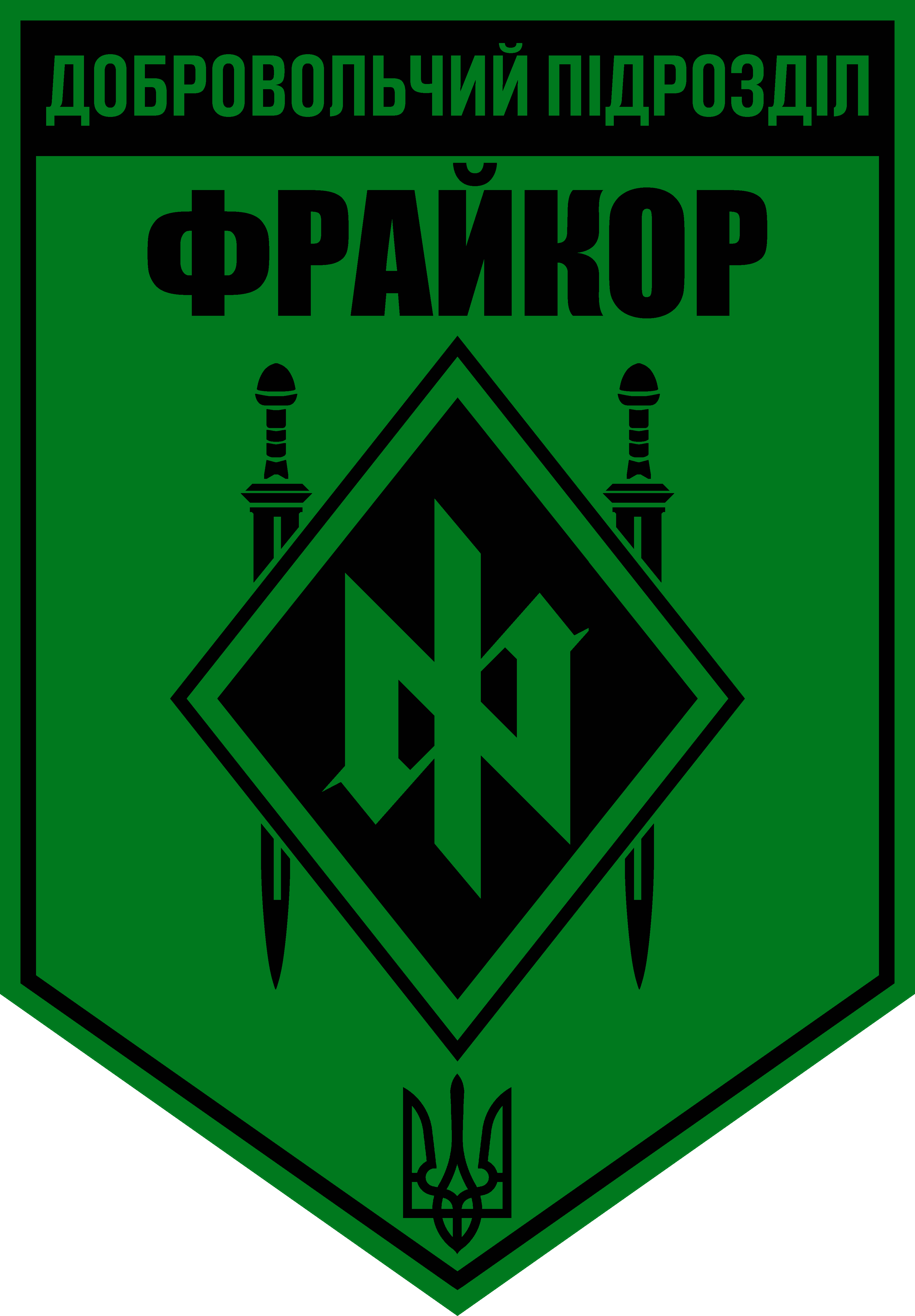
- Field Insignia

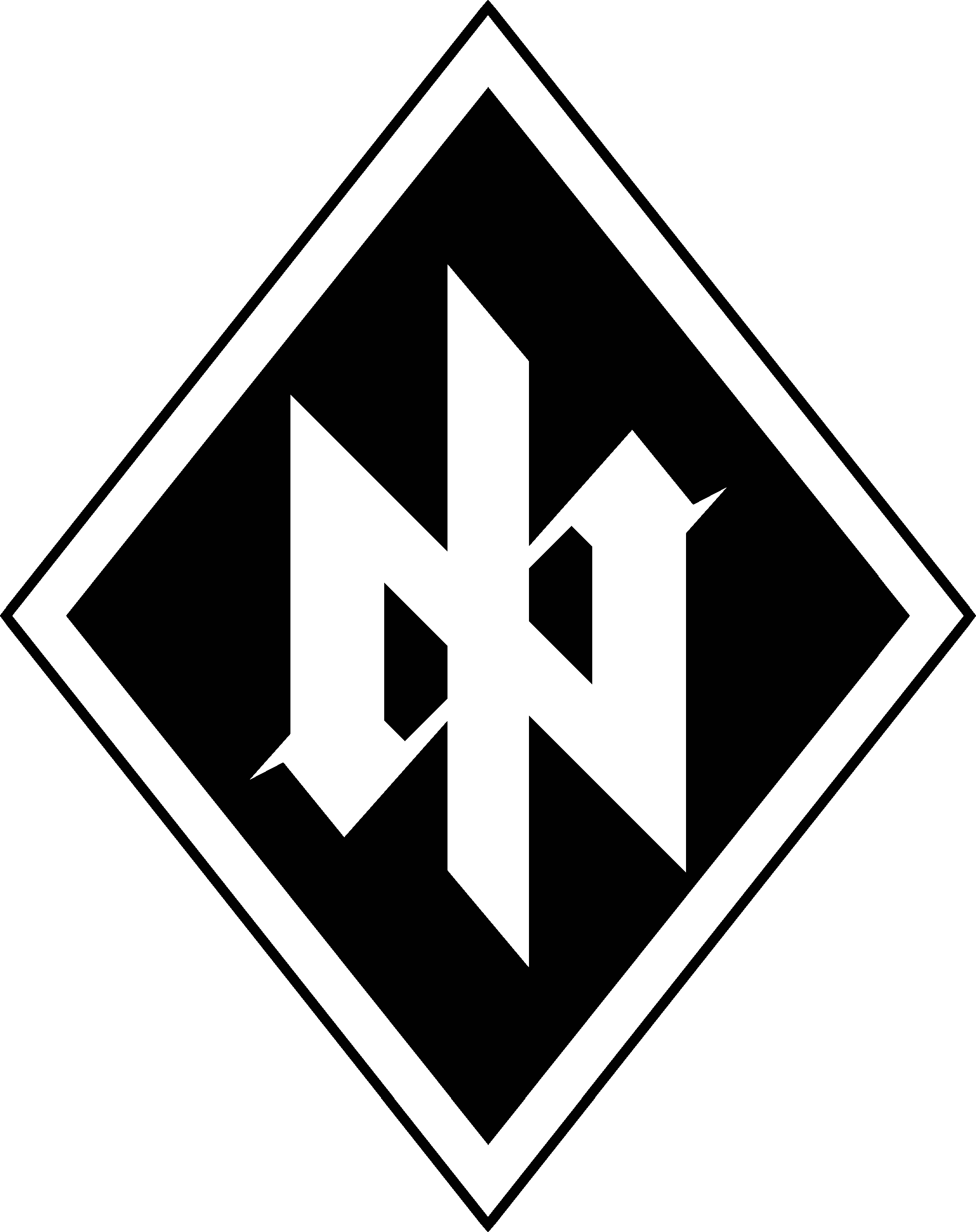
- Rhombus Patch

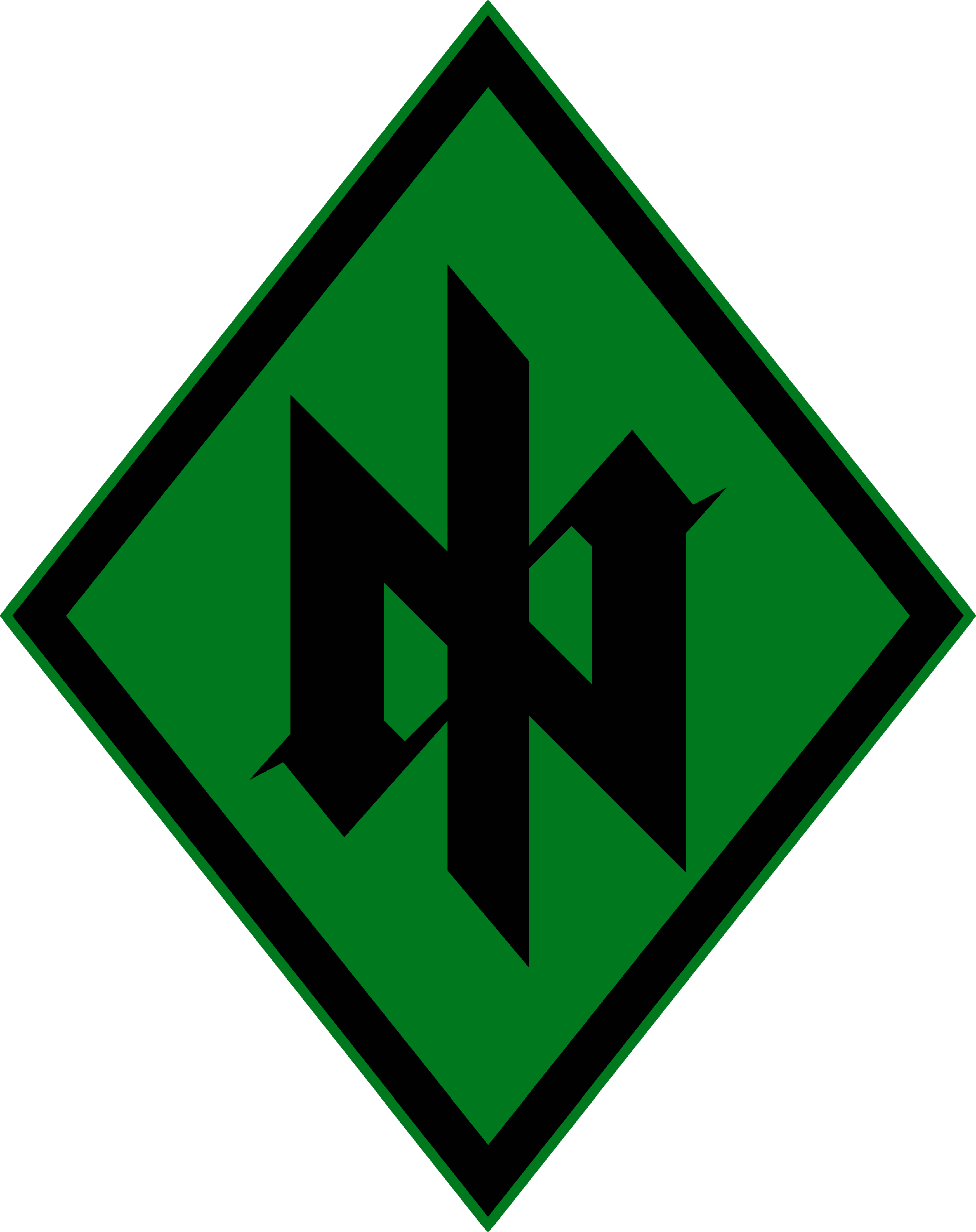
- Field Rhombus Patch

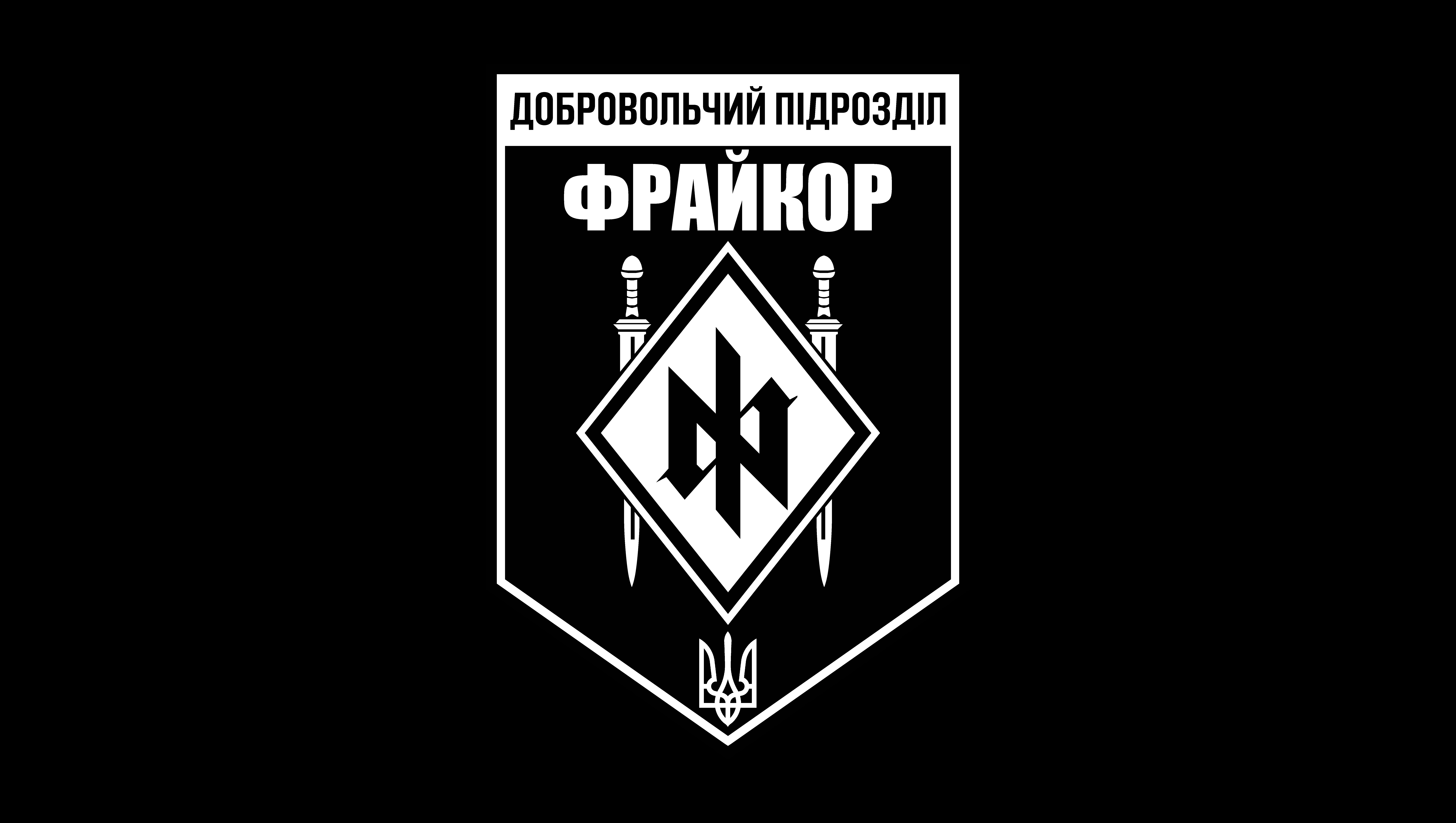
- Flag

Freikorps (Ukrainian: Фрайкор) is an independent Ukrainian military volunteer unit and a far right organization based in Kharkiv, established in 2017 by Heorhiy Tarasenko, it has taken part in both the War in Donbass as well as the Russian invasion of Ukraine, distinguishing itself during the Battle of Kharkiv. In addition to military-aligned activities, it has also been directly participating in protests, targeted attacks, and drug trade. It is also known to openly take homophobic, anti-feminist, Christian nationalist, xenophobic and Islamophobic stances. It is named after the German Freikorps. Its first commander Heorhiy Tarasenko was killed in action in 2022 and was the first volunteer to be awarded the Hero of Ukraine.

== History ==
It was established as a nationalist organization by a former member of the National Corps, Heorhiy Tarasenko on 21 May 2017. Aiming to participate in the War in Donbass, the organization gained support from "Sirko" of the Ukrainian Volunteer Corps who connected them with the fighters of the 57th Motorized Brigade. The personnel were deployed for combat on 13 July 2017 for the first time and remained deployed for 22 months, seeing combat in Donetsk, Mariupol and near Kharkiv, specifically seeing combat in Pisky, Pavlopil and repelling separatist assaults in Avdiivka, seeing action as part of the Joint Forces Operation. Freikorps kept on closing in the "gray zone" and strengthening the front line. Initially, in 2017, together with the 57th brigade, they advanced about one kilometer forward. In 2017, the distance to the enemy positions, which was initially 2-2.5 kilometers was reduced to 500–700 meters. The organization increased its strength and manpower and continued partaking in combat operations. The commander of the stronghold, to which the Freikorps was deployed in 2017 during the storming of separatist positions in Donetsk, became a platoon commander of the Freikorps. The Freikorps organization was registered in Kharkiv on 19 March 2018. In June 2019, Freikorps, together with other associations such as"Tradition and Order", Right Sector and National Corps held a demonstration during the congress of the "Trust in Affairs" party, after which they destroyed the bust of Georgy Zhukov by knocking it over and placed a Ukrainian flag in its place. In March 2021, it held patriotic education lessons at Kharkiv Gymnasium No. 43.

Following the start of the Russian invasion of Ukraine, it saw heavy combat. During the war, Freikorps captured a lot of heavy equipment, including MT-LBs and 152-mm self-propelled gun, but exchanged for lighter equipment like 120-mm mortar. It saw heavy action especially in Kharkiv. On 24 February, Freikorps took up positions on Northern Saltivka with a strength of about 20 people and handed over these positions later to Ukrainian Armed Forces and themselves took up positions on the Ring Road. On 25 February, the personnel of Freikorps prepared RPGs against tank assaults and on 27 February, a column of Russian "Tigers" with the letters "Z" arrived and its detachments went to intercept them at the 134th school. First, the 92nd Brigade halted the column forcing Russians to abandon the vehicles. Freikorps' tasks included clearing the road along Shevchenko Street, a main road to North Saltivka, with a major assault being expected from Saltivka. The Russians, having occupied the school no 134, blocked a main overpass making logistics nearly impossible. Ultimately, Russian forces were driven out the Russian forces from the premises of School No. 134 by Freikorps and other units. Then, Freikorps took up defense along the Ring Road, preparing for an expected besiegement. On 12 March, it identified and destroyed a Russian sabotage group in Kharkiv. On 25 March 2022, Freikorps Commander Heorhiy Tarasenko was killed in action and was later awarded the Hero of Ukraine, becoming the first volunteer to receive this award. In March–April, the unit saw heavy action in northern Kharkiv Oblast, temporarily captured Ternova completely and also participated in the liberation of Mala Rohan, Sorokivka, Peremoha and Vesele. In May, along with a small reinforcement from the 72nd Mechanized Brigade, it liberated Stary Saltiv and Ternova. Freikorps took part in the 2022 Kharkiv counteroffensive with the first combat being seen in Balakliia, the Freikorps entered from the western part of the city, established positions on the Balakliia River, occupied river crossings and paved the way for heavy equipment following which they established a bridgehead for other units to arrive and continued clearance operations. It later also saw combat during offensive operation towards Kupyansk and Vovchansk. In 2025, it was also involved in UAV operations.

=== Controversies ===
Freikorps has been "banned in court" by the Freedom House office due to the use of violence in propaganda and human rights violations. Freikorps positions itself as a far right, national-conservative, christian nationalist and traditionalist organization. Its founders also established the "Gun Pride" NGO, aimed at the legalization of short-barreled firearms; moreover, the NGOs "Patriot of Slobozhanshchyna" and "Turklub Edelweiss", were also established by its founders, the latter reportedly having ties with the nationalist "Edelweiss" organization and known for attacking a journalist reporting on LGBT people in Vinnytsia. It is also known to have established several militarized nationalist and homophobic organizations. It is known to partake in "violent resistance" to LGBT and "tolerance topics", as well as seeking "control" over drug trafficking in Kharkiv. Since 2018, Freikorps has disrupted dozens of LGBT and feminist events, attacking and beating people along with other far right organizations. They also organized support rallies during court hearings of Serhiy Mazur, who attacked a Romani camp and of Serhiy Maystrenko, who attacked a passerby and had an altercation with a cosmetics store selling Russian gel nail polish. It has also spoken in support of US President Donald Trump and has also been a part of White lives matter.

On 11 June 2019, it established "effective control" over the Kharkiv's underground after crushing a "drug den" at the intersection of Gvardiytsiv-Shyronintsiv and Heroiv Pratsi Streets, the den was owned by Turkish and Azerbaijani nationals, which contributed to xenophobia as the organization stated that it was a "warning to Caucasians" and that foreigners are only "guests on Earth". The organization has also labelled the people in the occupied regions as "separatists" and minors as the "children of collaborators". The organization is also known to be highly Islamophobic and has been known to even label the Crimean Tatars under this umbrella. Its insignia also utilizes the neo-Nazi "national idea" symbol "ꑭ".

== Commanders ==
- Tarasenko Georgy Oleksandrovych † (13 July 2017 – 25 March 2022)
