= Friedrich Joseph Haass =

Dr. Friedrich Joseph Haass
- Фёдор Петрович Гааз
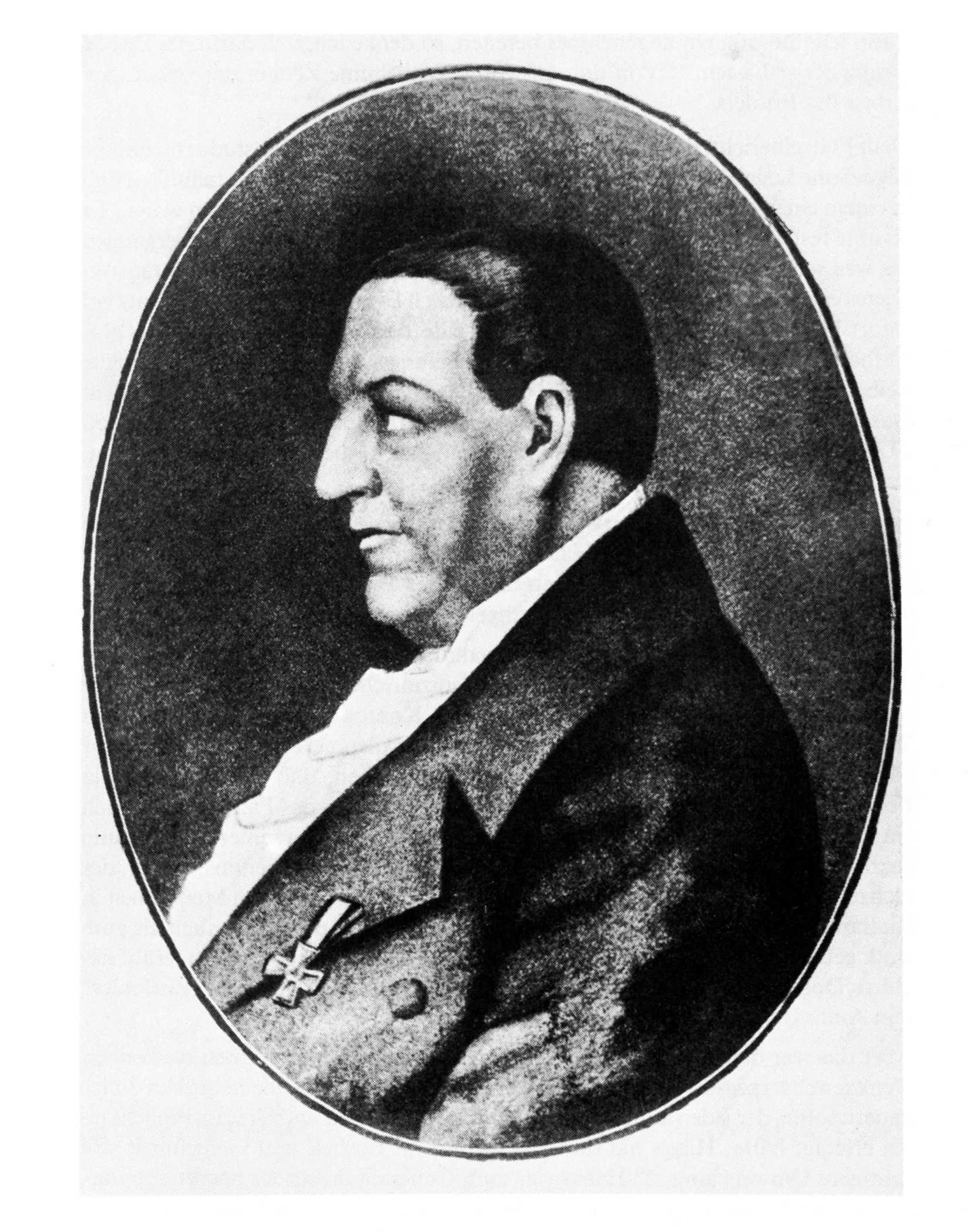
- Born: August 10, 1780; Bad Münstereifel
- Died: August 28, 1853 (aged 73); Moscow

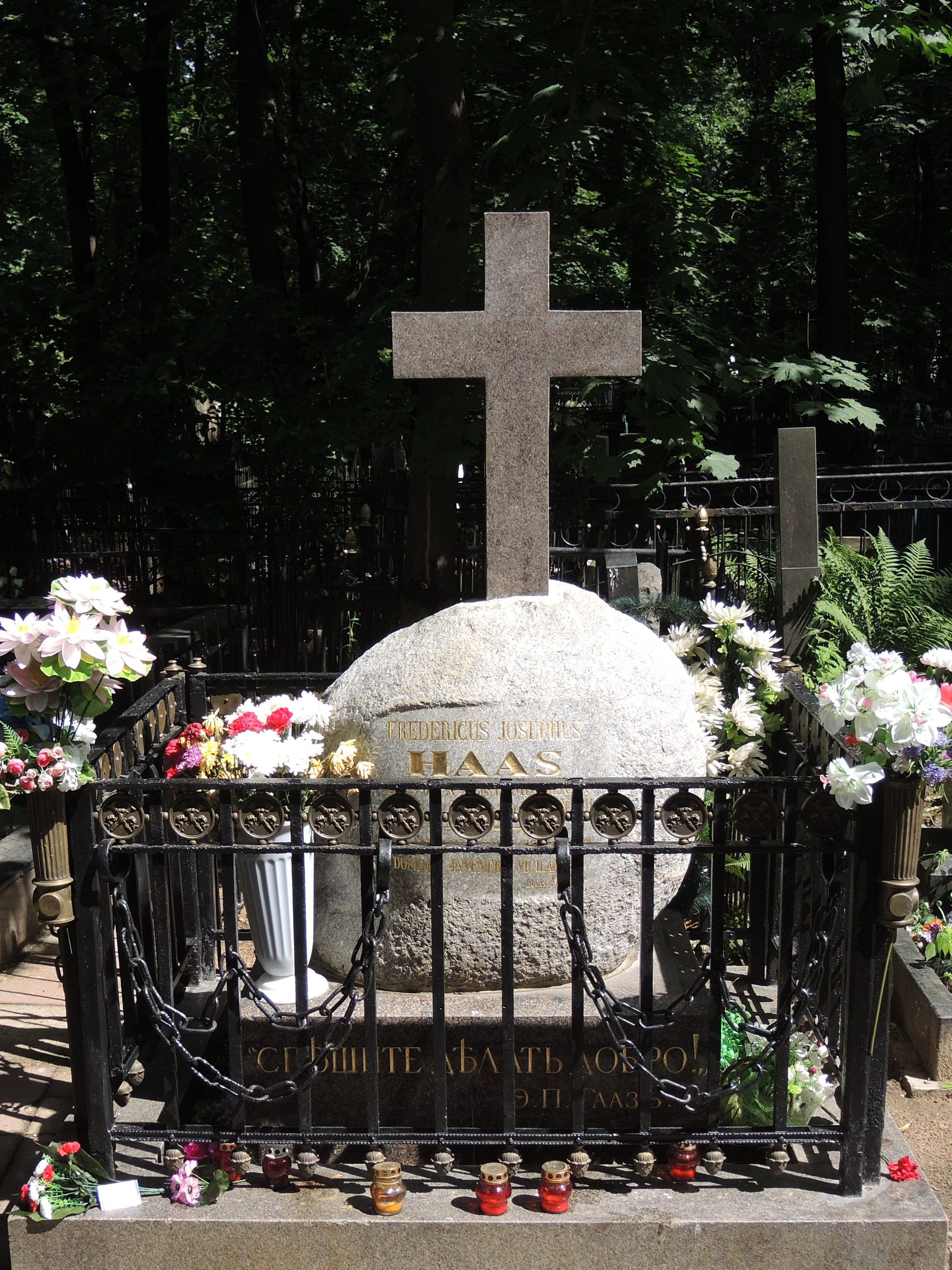
Grave of Friedrich Joseph Haass on Vvedenskoye Cemetery in Moscow

Friedrich Joseph Haass (Russian: Фёдор Петрович Гааз, Fyodor Petrovich Gaaz; 10 August 1780 – 28 August [O.S. 16 August] 1853) was the "holy doctor of Moscow". Born in Bad Münstereifel, as a member of Moscow's governmental prison committee, he spent the last 25 years of his life working to humanize the penal system. In the last nine years before his death, he spent all of his assets to run a hospital for homeless people. He died in Moscow. Twenty thousand people attended his funeral at the Vvedenskoye Cemetery, which was paid for by the state as he had left no more money.

He has a Catholic remembrance day of the 16th of August.

== Literature ==
- Lew Kopelew: Der Heilige Doktor Fjodor Petrowitsch. Die Geschichte des Friedrich Joseph Haass. Hoffmann und Campe, Hamburg 1984.
- Koni, Anatolij Fedorovic: "Doktor Friedrich Haass. Lebensskizze eines deutschen Philanthropen in Rußland", in: Zur Geschichte des russischen Gefängniswesens im 19. Jahrhundert, (translated into German), Duncker & Humblot, Leipzig 1899.
