= 1st Maine Cavalry Regiment =

American Civil War cavalry unit

- Active: October 31, 1861 – August 1, 1865
- Country: United States
- Allegiance: Union
- Branch: United States Army
- Type: Cavalry
- Nickname: "The Puritans"
- Equipment: 1861 – Model 1860 Light Cavalry Saber, 2 x Colt .44 "Army" pistols, issued 10 Sharps Carbine per company (personal purchase Burnside, Merrill, Sharps, & Smith Carbines); 1863– Model 1860 Light Cavalry Saber, 2 × Colt .44 "Army" pistols, 1 × Burnside carbine (personal purchase Sharps Carbine); 1864 – Model 1860 Light Cavalry Saber, 2 × Colt .44 "Army" pistols, 1 × Spencer carbine, (from 1st DC Cavalry Henry rifles)
- Engagements: First Battle of Winchester; Battle of Cedar Mountain; Second Battle of Bull Run; Battle of South Mountain; Battle of Antietam; Battle of Fredericksburg; Second Battle of Rappahannock Station; Battle of Brandy Station; Battle of Aldie; Battle of Middleburg; Battle of Upperville; Battle of Gettysburg; Battle of White Sulphur Springs; Battle of Shepherdstown; Battle of Mine Run; Kilpatrick's Raid on Richmond; Battle of Old Church; Battle of Todd's Tavern; Ground Squirrel Bridge; Battle of Haw's Shop; Battle of Cold Harbor; Battle of Trevilian Station; Battle of Saint Mary's Church; First Battle of Deep Bottom; Second Battle of Ream's Station; Battle of Vaughan Road; Battle of Boydton Plank Road

The 1st Maine Cavalry Regiment was a volunteer United States cavalry unit from Maine used during the American Civil War.

== Service history ==
The regiment was organized in Augusta, Maine, on October 31, 1861, and served for three years. The original members were detached from the regiment on September 15, 1864, when their service was up, and mustered out back in Portland on November 25. Later recruits, along with the Maine men of the 1st District of Columbia Cavalry (men recruited in the Augusta, Maine area between January and March 1864 and consolidated into seven companies) and those who chose to reenlist, were retained in the regiment. The regiment was split into three battalions of four companies each. One battalion was made up of former 1st District men and the other two were a mix of 1st Maine veterans and DC men. These three battalions continued until the regiment's mustering out at Petersburg, Virginia, on August 1, 1865.

=== Initial organization in 1861 ===
Maine had responded to Lincoln and Congress's April 25, 1861, call for ten regiments of infantry of which eight had been organized and left the state by the end of August. That month the federal government had put out a call to Maine for five more regiments of infantry, six batteries of light artillery, a company of sharpshooters, and a regiment of cavalry to serve three years. (Note: On May 3, 1861, the president issued a call for troopsfor 500,000 men. Many states including Maine exceeded their quota and enlisted 700,680 men. Maine's quota was 17,500 men in this call; she raised 18,104.)

This cavalry regiment was intentionally raised at large from all counties of Maine and organized into twelve companies. (Note: Almost all volunteer cavalry regiments mustered into the United States Army using infantry terminology in organization with company vice troop.) The regiment's staff consisted of a colonel, lieutenant colonel, three majors, a first or second lieutenant as adjutant, surgeon, assistant surgeon, chaplain, regimental quartermaster, regimental commissary of subsistence, and three first or second lieutenants serving as battalion quartermasters. (Note: General Order 15, May 4, 1861, set the organization for a cavalry regiment as three battalions, each with two squadrons, each of two troops making twelve troops/companies total. A squadron was two or three companies commanded by the senior company commander. A battalion, commanded by a major, was two squadrons with each squadron made of at two companies. A colonel, assisted by a lieutenant colonel, commanded the three battalions in the regiment – totaling twelve companies per regiment. On an ad hoc basis, a squadron occasionally included a third company.) The regiment rated a sergeant major, a sergeant as a chief bugler, a veterinary surgeon, a regimental quartermaster sergeant, regimental commissary sergeant, hospital steward, saddler sergeant, sergeant farrier, and an ordnance sergeant. A captain commanded each company in the 1st Maine with a first lieutenant and a second lieutenant commanding the two platoons. The company commander also had the aid of a company first sergeant, a company quartermaster sergeant, a company commissary sergeant, a farrier, and a sergeant acting as the company commander's orderly. Each lieutenant in the platoon had two sergeants, four corporals, a bugler, and 39 privates. This gave each company a paper strength of 100 men. (Note: Over the course of the men's service this number was rarely maintained)

The regiment had high standards for its recruits and the quality of its mounts. Recruiters were to enlist "none but sound, able-bodied men in all respects, between the ages of eighteen and thirty-five years of correct morals and temperate habits, active, intelligent, vigorous, and hardy, weighing not less than one hundred and twenty-five or more than one hundred and sixty pounds" While the average United States Infantryman was 26 and 5′ 8.25″ tall and 155 pounds, the average United States Cavalryman was the same age but slightly shorter at 5′ 7″ and lighter at 145 pounds. It encamped at Augusta at the State Fairground, renamed Camp Penobscot, where recruits initially learned military discipline and drill. Horses would arrive in December.

The 1st Maine Volunteer Cavalry Regiment mustered into federal service at Augusta on November 5, 1861, as a three-year volunteer cavalry regiment. It was commanded by Col. John Goddard from Cape Elizabeth. A Regular Army cavalry officer, Lt. Col. Thomas Hight, was the second-in-command. Another regular, Capt. Benjamin F Tucker served as the Adjutant with the rest of the field and staff officers and non-commissioned officers (NCOs) being Maine men. In the companies, apart from the Company H commander, Capt. George J. Summat and the 1st Lieutenant in Company L, 1st Lt. Constantine Taylor, all the company officers and NCOs were Maine volunteers.

The 1st Maine had an advantage in recruiting over the infantry and artillery. Many recruits found the idea of riding rather than walking incredibly attractive. Also, the cavalry had an air of glamor and romance that the other branches did not have:

There hung about the cavalry service a dash and an excitement which attracted those men who had read and remembered the glorious achievements of 'Light Horse Harry' and his brigade, and of 'Morgan's Men' in the revolutionary war, or who had devoured the story of 'Charles O'Malley,' and similar works. In short, men who had read much in history or in fiction, preferred the cavalry service. (Note: Almost forgotten, "Charles O'Malley, the Irish Dragoon" by English novelist Charles Lever had been a best-selling novel from 1841.)

It is unclear whether the 1st Maine received either the 1854 cavalry shell jacket or 1857 sack coat or both. The army did issue all ranks the same standard sky-blue double-breasted winter overcoat with attached cape and a rubberized poncho for rainwear. They also received the special sky-blue wool cavalry trousers with the reinforcing double layer in the seat and inside leg due to the expected extended time in the saddle.

=== Training, deployment, and operations in 1862 ===
There were prejudices against the cavalry in the War Department as it was originally thought it would not be of much use during the expected short period of conflict. (Note: War Department had little faith in the idea of volunteer cavalry. Consequently, offers of mounted troops were steadily refused during the first summer. It was only after the terrible summer of 1861 that the idea of a short war was dashed and a provision for cavalry regiments was included with Lincoln's call for three-year volunteers.) Maj. Gen. George McClellan felt that it took a minimum of two years to professionally train volunteer cavalry and that they would have nothing to do but be couriers and pickets. There was also the added factor that the cost to equip and mount a Union cavalry regiment in 1861 was between $500,000 and $600,000, or roughly twice that of an infantry regiment. Some of the leadership in the command understood the lack of faith:

The men of the south were born horsemen, almost. Old and young were nearly or quite as much at home on horseback as on foot, and the horses, also, were used to the saddle. Therefore, they could put cavalry regiments into the field with great facility and in comparatively good fighting condition, as witness the famous Black Horse Cavalry. In the northern and eastern states, it was different. Equestrianism was almost one of the lost arts. Few, especially in cities, were accustomed to riding, and the great majority of men who would enlist in the cavalry must learn to ride and to use arms on horseback, as well as learn drill, discipline, camp duties, and the duties of service generally. "A sailor on horseback," is a synonym for all that is awkward, but the veriest Jack tar on horseback was no more awkward than was a large proportion of the men who entered the cavalry service in the north and east.

While the federal government figured out where to send the regiment, they continued training at the camp living in army issue camp tents through a cold winter. The recruits were soon finding the reality of cavalry life to be quite different from their preconceived notions. The command stressed the importance of caring for their mounts and had a stable built before the first horses arrived. The necessary caring for their means of mobility, their mounts, made the men's days busier and longer than the infantryman's. During the cold, in which the regiment lost 200 men to disease and injuries, the men noted that their horses "had quarters that winter more comfortable than did the men, in comparison with the usual accommodations for man and beast".

When Edwin Stanton replaced the disgraced Simon Cameron as Secretary of War, the 1st Maine narrowly avoided disbandment before they even saw service. They were saved by the intervention of an officer who was impressed by their enthusiasm and rapid learning. As training continued, the men and horses gradually meshed into a cohesive unit overcoming the fact that many horses had no prior experience with being ridden and some of the men had no prior experience riding. (Note: Company K was an example of the aforementioned "sailor on horseback" formed from mariners and was known through the regiment and its future brigades for using nautical terminology while in service.)

Col. John Goddard, a lumberman, was disliked by the regiment because he was a strict disciplinarian and a rigid moralist, (Note: Goddard had said that any officer who did not sign a temperance oath would never be promoted in his command. The large number of temperance observers in the regiment earned it the nickname, "The Puritans.") but many of the regiment's veterans later credited his hard hand with making them soldiers. However, he was disliked by almost all such that some officers went to Augusta threatening to resign if he was not removed. Governor Washburn wanted no problems, so Goddard resigned his commission on March 1, 1862. Maj. Samuel H. Allen was commissioned Colonel by the governor and took command. To replace him, Capt. Warren L. Whitney of Company A was promoted to Major. In turn, 1st Lt. Sidney W. Thaxter was made Captain and new Company A commander. Due to being passed over in favor of Allen, Lt. Col. Hight resigned and returned to command his company, in the 4th U.S. Cavalry. At that time, the regiment was organized into three battalions: 1st Battalion (under Maj. Warren L. Whitney with companies A, D, E and F), 2nd Battalion (under Maj. Calvin S. Douty with companies B, I, H and M), and 3rd Battalion (under Maj. David P. Stowell with companies C, G, K and L).

Still without weapons, the 1st Maine's training was drawn from the experience and training of the regular army personnel assigned to the regiment and concentrated on getting the men and their horses to work efficiently as a team in the various formations called for by cavalry regulations. The officers and non-commissioned officers (NCOs) read and studied their copies of two manuals, McClellan's Regulations and Instructions for the Field Service of the United States Cavalry in Time of War and Cooke's, Cavalry Tactics, or, Regulations for the instruction, formations, and movements of the cavalry of the army and volunteers of the United States (both published in 1861 at the start of the conflict). Through these manuals and the guidance of the regulars, the Maine troopers learned the various formations for travel and combat, the basics of setting up pickets and vedettes, and the various bugle calls to command and coordinate all these activities.

Dismounted drill was of secondary importance, but it was not forgotten. The lack of sabers was part of the shortage that plagued the U.S. volunteer cavalry organizations during the first year of the war led to "some ludicrous improvisations". The 1st Maine's solution was to buy wooden laths:

Some time during the winter laths were procured, for the purpose of learning and practicing the sabre exercise. These were made into swords of the most grotesque shape by the men, and the exercise was looked upon very generally as a farce, was 1aughed at by outsiders, and was discontinued after a very short time; yet there is no doubt that the rudiments of the use of the sabre learned with the aid of those wooden swords was never forgotten, and proved to be of advantage when the real sabre was put into the hands of the· men. No arms were furnished, except a few old muskets for use on guard duty, till the regiment arrived at Washington.

==== Departure for Washington and the front ====
Col. Finally, in March the regiment was ordered to the front in Virginia. 1st Battalion left for Washington on Friday, March 14, 1862, under command of Col. Allen, arriving on Wednesday, the 19th without Allen who had fallen sick and was hospitalized in New York City. Delayed by a late winter snowstorm, 2nd Battalion departed Augusta on Thursday, March 20, under Maj. Douty, arriving on Monday, the 24th. On that day, 3rd Battalion under Maj. Stowell left and pulled into DC on the 28th.The battalions all entrained in box cars in Augusta, eight horses and men per box car, and rode to New York city via Portland, Boston, and Providence. After a ferry across the Hudson, the detachments had a more comfortable transit to Washington with the horses in the box cars, but the men in passenger cars.

As each company in the regiment detrained and reported at the Washington Depot or New Jersey Avenue Station, each trooper received his official government arms issue of a Model 1860 Light Cavalry Saber and a pair of Colt Model 1860 revolver. (Note: Sabers, especially brand-new ones, were issued with blunt edges that troopers were required to sharpen. The 1st Maine also received revolvers as a pair vice a single to compensate the lack of carbines.) The regiment also received an issue of ten breech-loaded Sharps Carbines per company, however, by now, a number of the regiment's men had privately purchased breech-loaded Sharps, Burnsides, Smith, and Merrill carbines in Maine before departure or from one of the merchants along the rail route, to give themselves a weapon with a greater range. This meant that the 1st Maine had a slightly higher proportion of carbines than the average U.S. Volunteer cavalry regiment. (Note: Merrills were manufactured in Baltimore and sold not far from the train stations.) In Washington, the regiment pitched their tents with other reinforcements on Capitol Hill on the 29th. In camp, the regiment immediately began grinding and sharpening their newly issued blades.

On Sunday, March 30, the regiment received orders to send five companies to Harper's Ferry and join the Federal troops providing security for the Baltimore & Ohio's link between Washington and the Ohio Valley. On that day, the line had reopened, and the War Department wanted to guard it against rebel raids. Maj. Douty took five companies with the largest number of carbines and organized them into a new 1st Battalion. The remainder of the regiment would stay in Washington awaiting the return of Col. Allen. The regiment, "five months after its organization, was at Washington, armed and equipped, and a portion of it under marching orders."

The 1st Battalion, comprising companies A, B, E, H, and M, loaded on box cars Monday, March 31 for Harper's Ferry, by way of Frederick and joined the " Railroad Brigade" commanded by Col. Dixon Stansbury Miles, which guarded the important logistical route. The battalion's companies were separated and assigned to duty at different points along the railroad.

The remainder of the regiment remained in Washington DC. They spent the days after the 1st Battalion's departure honing their sabers and "in drill, mounted and dismounted, and in the manual of arms, and in generally preparing for active service".

==== The Shenandoah, the "Middletown Disaster," and First Winchester ====
To win the war, the United States needed to defeat the Confederate armies in the field. To win the war, the rebels had to break the will of the Federals to fight. The Shenandoah Valley, between the Blue Ridge Mountains and the Appalachians, figured in both of those war aims and ergo its control was strategically important. Known as the breadbasket of the Confederacy, the Shenandoah Valley provided a route for rebel attacks into Maryland, Washington, and Pennsylvania, thereby cutting the link between Washington and the midwest (Note: In June 1861, then militia Col. Thomas Jackson attacked the B&O contrary to the famous May 23, 1861, Martinsburg raid since revealed to be a postbellum, "Lost Cause" fiction.) — directly attacking the United States' will to fight. The valley "was rich in grain, cattle, sheep, hogs, and fruit and was in such a prosperous condition that the Rebel army could march itself down and up it, billeting on the inhabitants." which meant that Yankee control of the valley would weaken the rebel armies helping to defeat them. Because of its strategic importance it was the scene of three major campaigns. The valley, especially in the lower northern section, was also the scene of bitter partisan fighting as the region's inhabitants were deeply divided over loyalties, and Confederate partisan John Mosby and his Rangers frequently operated in the area. Due its strategic importance, the valley saw an ebb and flow between the contesting armies until the last autumn of the war.

Transport of goods from the valley to the east was done via a network of macadamized pikes/turnpikes and rail between the larger towns supported by numerous smaller dirt roads and canals knitting them further. Much of this system had been put in place by Virginia Board of Public Works (VBPW) under the guidance of Claudius Crozet. The main north–south road transportation was the Valley Turnpike, (Note: This now approximates as U.S. Route 11 in the Shenandoah Valley of Virginia. In original sources and current usage,"Up the Valley" in this context refers to movement to higher altitude and indicates a southward direction. This was the Native American tribes' Great Path migratory route between what is now Georgia and Canada. As white settlers began to move up the valley in the eighteenth century, it became known as the "Great Wagon Road.) a public-private venture through the VBPW running 68 miles (109 km) from Martinsburg up through Winchester, Harrisonburg, and ending at Staunton. There were several other macadamized roads running between the larger towns and railroads. Three rail lines were the main east–west routes with B&O in the lower valley, Manassas Gap in the middle/upper, and the Virginia Central in the upper, southern end all connecting to the Valley Pike. The B&O met it at Martinsburg, the Manassas Gap met it at Strasburg after passing through the Blue Ridge Mountains at Manassas Gap at Front Royal, and the Virginia Central met it at Staunton after coming through the mountains in Crozet's Blue Ridge Tunnel.

Rebels under Jackson had severed the B&O at the northern end of the lower Shenandoah Valley during the late spring and summer of the prior year. Repeated raids and operations by Jackson's cavalry subordinate Turner Ashby and his the 7th Virginia Cavalry ("Ashby's Brigade" (Note: Referred to as such as Ashby kept on recruiting companies so that by the time he was mortally wounded and Richard Henry Dulany took command of the regiment, it had swelled to 29 companies.)) damaged so much railway infrastructure that it took over ten months to reopen the line on March 30, 1862. The paved roads were a great asset to the rebels in the valley being unaffected by inclement weather. An official report described Martinsburg as "on the Baltimore and Ohio Railroad, at the northern terminus of the Valley Pike—a broad macadamized road, running up the valley, through Winchester, and terminating at Staunton." Besides being a node between road and rail, Martinsburg was also home to the large, important B&O maintenance shop and roundhouse.

For the United States, the Maine men in the five companies were vital to keeping the B&O open. The battalion (and the rest of the regiment that remained in D.C.) would have an eventful Spring in 1862 marked by participation in operations against Jackson in the Shenandoah Campaign.

===== The Railroad Brigade =====
Maj. Douty and his five companies arrived in Harper's Ferry and were immediately posted to key facilities along the line. Capt. George M. Brown's Company M remained in Harper's Ferry. The rest were loaded aboard the B&O and sent to their posts. Maj. Douty and Capt. Sidney W. Thaxter's Company A were the first stop and offloaded at the B&O maintenance shop in Martinsburg. Capt. Black Hawk Putnam's Company E was the next to detrain at Back Creek where the B&O crossed it before flowing past Allensville and emptying into the Potomac. (Note: Tobie mistakenly recalled it as Black River Creek.) Company H commanded by Capt. George J. Summat was dropped off along the rail line opposite Hancock, MD. Capt. Jonathan B. Cilley and Company B was furthest west and last off at the Berkely Springs resort. (Note: B was briefly stationed further west at Great Cacapon for a few days until Miles moved it to the resort to better cover the stretch of the railroad as it came around the northward jut of the mountains at Hancock. Incidentally Berkeley Springs was then known as Bath and had served as one of Jackson's encampments over the 1861–1862 winter.)

As well as scouting and patrolling along the rail beds, the companies patrolled out from their bases along several of the macadamized pikes. In this period along the important artery, the men of the 1st Battalion learned their craft well gaining valuable experience in the saddle. There were a handful of skirmishes, and the men of the 1st Maine captured some rebel prisoners during this period, successfully defending the line and keeping it open. On April 14, Maj. Douty received a promotion to Lieutenant Colonel of the regiment. During their time on this duty, the men of this battalion began to learn what a valuable source the local black population, enslaved and free, was for intelligence as well as who and where the local Unionists were. Of note the men in Company A were greatly pleased to be in Martinsburg where the overwhelming majority of Unionists caused the rebels to call it "Little Massachusetts".

===== Joining Banks =====
Throughout April and May, Banks and his Department of the Shenandoah had been receiving direct tasking from Secretary of War Stanton on coordinating with Maj. Gen. John C. Fremont's Mountain Department and Maj. Gen. McDowell's Department of the Rappahannock. This had led to stripping of assets from Banks and changing orders between joining with one of the other departments. As April rolled into May, Banks continued to receive frequent directives daily from the War Department over the telegraph. This revolution in communications hindered Banks in that it kept him on a tether of sorts inhibiting his freedom of action.

On Friday, May 9, 1862, the 1st Battalion came together from the various company posts to Martinsburg and went up the valley (south) to join Maj. Gen. Nathaniel P. Banks' forces at Strasburg. They joined Brig. Gen. John P. Hatch's cavalry brigade. By May 13, the men of the 1st Maine found that Banks had divided his force to an extent that he only had 6,500 men with him astride the Valley Pike in Strasburg and 2,500 in Front Royal, fifteen miles east-southeast on the east side of the valley. On that day, Brig. Gen. Shields had departed from Front Royal on the Manassas Gap Railroad to go east and join McDowell's department. The small garrison (Col. John Kenly, his Union 1st Maryland Infantry, and Companies B and D of 5th New York Cavalry) at the Front Royal station was to prevent rebel movement along the Manassas Gap rail line. Hatch's brigade covered the approaches to Strasburg with Hatch encamped at Middletown. On May 20, Douty was promoted to Lieutenant Colonel.

At the point in the valley where Banks had advanced, the Manassas Gap rail met another macadamized road, Winchester-Front Royal Pike, that ran eighteen miles along the eastern side of the valley and met Valley Pike at Winchester, 25 miles southwest of Harper's Ferry. Valley Pike passed seven miles over Cedar Creek down to Middletown, three miles further to Newtown (present day Stephens City), and finally seven miles into Winchester where it met the Winchester-Front Royal road. Several dirt roads ran between these to paved roads on either side of the valley. The men of Lt. Col. Douty's battalion go to know the lay of the land during their patrols in the upper Shenandoah Valley in the next couple of weeks. They learned who the Unionists were and where the back roads went.

Soon, Banks started getting intelligence from the local Unionists and black population that Maj. Gen. Thomas J. "Stonewall" Jackson's corps of 17,000 men, fresh from whipping Maj. Gen. John C. Frémont's at McDowell was heading his way. Banks had been stripped of men and artillery so that his force of 23,000 at the beginning of May to 9,000 by the 21st. Since Jackson was now positioned to block him from joining with Fremont, Banks began wondering if his now reduced force around Strasburg and Front Royal, fifteen miles east-southeast on the east side of the valley, would be able to resist any contact with Jackson. On May 23, Banks received reports of Jackson attacking the garrison at Front Royal before the telegraph link was severed. He fired off telegrams to Stanton keeping the Secretary updated on intelligence on the Front Royal attack until early morning when he decided his outnumbered force's best option was to begin withdrawing to Winchester taking the Valley Turnpike so that he could take as much of his supply train with him. By 03:00, on May 24 the twelve-mile-long column of Banks' wagons began to roll north down the Valley Turnpike to Winchester.

===== Jackson advances =====
By 07:00 on May 24, 1862, a Saturday, Maj. Gen. Banks at Strasburg wired Secretary Stanton when he confirmed that Jackson's 17,000 had completely routed the garrison at Front Royal "with considerable loss in killed, wounded, and prisoners". and were closing on him, turning his position. Under these circumstances, Banks figured that if he could reach Winchester, he would preserve his lines of communication and increase the odds of reinforcement before contact. At dawn, Banks called Hatch forward from Middletown and had him push patrols to Woodstock and along Manassas Gap Railroad. He also tasked Hatch to round up any stragglers and put to torch any supplies of military value that could not be carried off. He then began his retreat north along the Valley Pike. Doughty's battalion and two companies of the 1st Vermont under Maj. William D. Collins, (Note: Throughout this detached duty, Maj. Collins would act as Douty's second-in-command.) just returned from patrol toward Woodstock at 02:00, (all told, a force of around 400 men) had temporarily camped at historic Belle Grove plantation (Note: Belle Grove was a colonial-era mansion that had been the home of Major Isaac Hite, brother-in-law of President James Madison and friendly neighbor of President Thomas Jefferson, who had personally designed the limestone dwelling for Hite in 1794.) Banks pulled them onto the road at 07:00 as a rear guard escort up the road to Middletown. Banks was anxious and wanted to know where the rebels were. He sent two companies of the 29th Pennsylvania Infantry and elements of the 1st Michigan Cavalry to head east on Chapel Road, a country lane which connected Middletown, four miles north, with Cedarville (modern North Front Royal) the site of Kenly's surrender, in turn, four miles north of Front Royal.

The 1st Battalion and the two companies took up position in the rear guard of the column as Banks' column set out on the road to Winchester. As the column passed through Middletown, Banks still had not heard from the 29th Pennsylvania and 1st Michigan. In "one of the smartest moves he made all day", Banks erred on the side of caution, sent messengers to Lt. Col. Douty, then waiting for the rear of the column at Toms Brook, to come up to headquarters with his command. The five companies of the 1st Battalion under Lt. Col. Douty and the squadron of the 1st Vermont were sent north to Newtown to turn east down Chapel Road until they met, identified, and observed any Rebels. The 1st Battalion's duties were the normal cavalry tasks "to ascertain if the enemy was in force in that vicinity, to gain all possible information of his movements, and report often. If [they] met the enemy advancing [they were] told to hold him in check if possible." Feeling a bit more secure, at 09:00, Banks ordered the 500-wagon train to begin the 20-mile trek to Winchester. (Note: Alongside the nearly 8,00 men in his command, Banks had almost 4,000 civilians following his army. Overwhelmingly composed of Black residents who had taken their own freedom, it also included white Unionists from the valley who had been driven from their homes by their secessionist neighbors with nothing but the proverbial clothes on their backs.)

Unknown to the 1st Battalion, they were about to meet Jackson's plan to trap Banks between Strasburg and Newtown on the Valley Turnpike. Jackson and Richard S. Ewell had spent the night at Cedarville and were up before dawn with his army ready to move. Still ignorant of Banks' precise location, Jackson had Ewell out on the Front Royal-Winchester Turnpike by 06:00. Jackson sent Brig. Gen. George Hume Steuart, in command of the 2nd and 6th Virginia Cavalry, ahead of the infantry to three miles north of Nineveh and cut west, off the roads and cross country to Newtown on the Valley Pike between Middletown and Winchester "to observe the movements of the enemy at that point". At the same time, he directed COL Turner Ashby and his 7th Virginia to send two companies east along the rail line from Front Royal to watch his rear, and three companies west along the rail line to scout the Federals in Strasburg. The remainder of the 7th would scout to the west of the Font Royal-Winchester pike and screen Jackson's infantry. (Note: The 7th Virginia Cavalry was actually by this time a combined arms unit that had 27 infantry and cavalry companies as well as an attached light artillery battery, much larger than a typical Civil War regiment and more akin to the Revolutionary war era Legions. Ashby was also hampered by the lack of enough staff officers to exercise efficient command. One result was a lack of discipline despite his tireless personal patrols of his long picket lines. An end result of this laxity was the failure to accomplish basic tasks like reporting back contact with the enemy, holding off from a distance and shadowing, and efficient rallying after charges.)

===== Initial contact =====
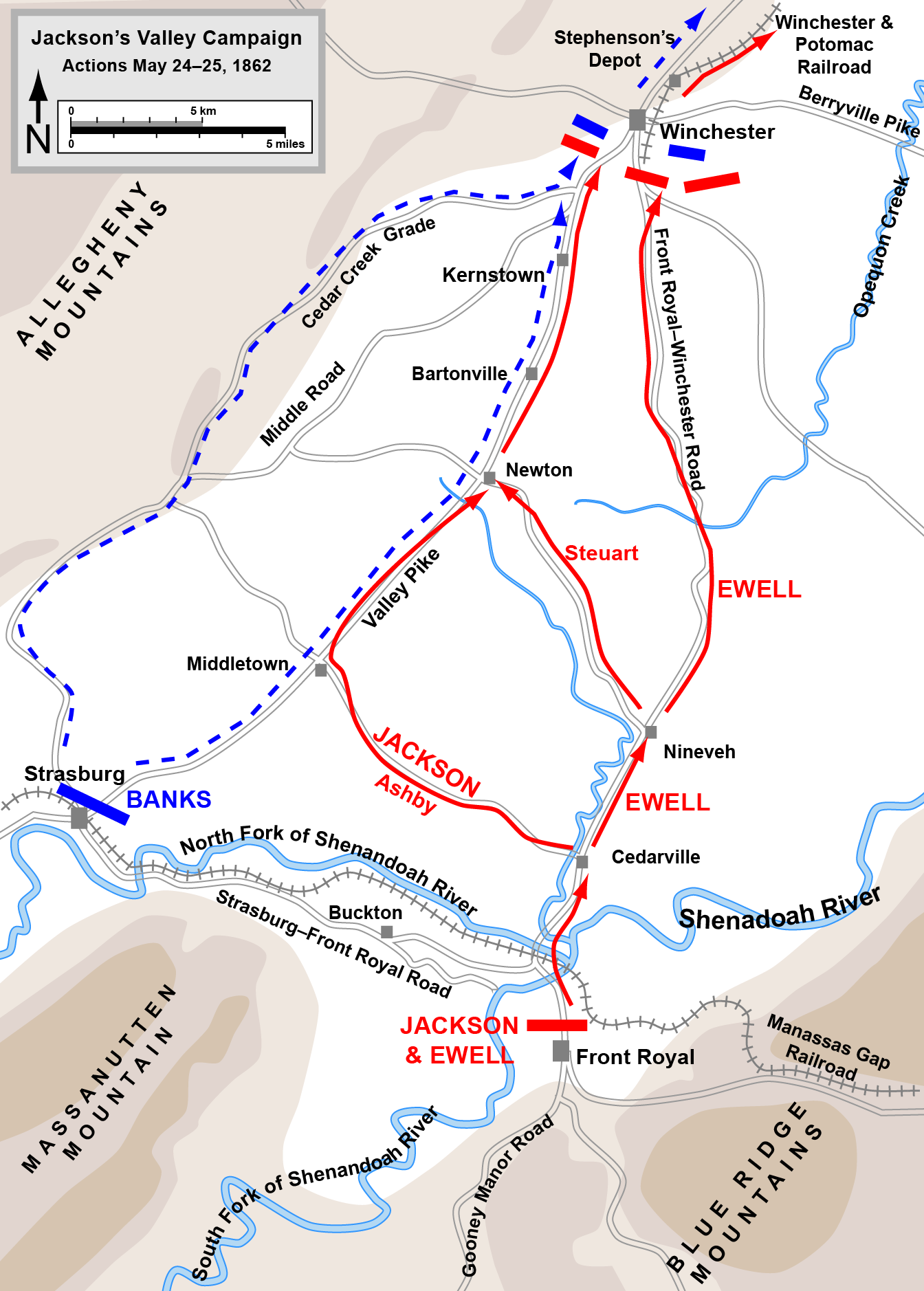
Actions from Front Royal to First Winchester, May 24–25, 1862. Lt. Col. Douty and his men met Ashby and Jackson's forces a mile short of the Winchester-Front-Royal Pike.

Steuart's force reached Newtown and found the road crowded with the lead portion of Banks' wagon train. Steuart charged the United States forces, captured prisoners, spread panic. While his troopers scattered the teamsters (which included many formerly enslaved local black residents who had good reason to avoid recapture), they did not burn the wagons which would have trapped the rest of Banks' train. They advanced south along the pike and met the main body of Banks' army a mile south of Newtown where they were driven off by infantry. Steuart reported his contact back to Jackson.

During the breakfast halt at Nineveh, Trimble drew Jackson's attention to a column of smoke coming from the direction of Strasburg. (Note: This was in fact, Hatch burning all stores of military value that could not be carried off by his retreating troops.) Receiving Steuart's report and opting to intercept Banks at Middletown, Jackson retraced his route to Cedarville. Ewell's division with the 1st Maryland Infantry, and supporting artillery, were to advance from Cedarville up Front Royal Pike to turn at Nineveh and be ready for Jackson's order to advance on Newton and meet Steuart. Meanwhile, COL Turner Ashby and Brig. Gen. Richard Taylor with his and Brig. Gen. Isaac Trimble's brigades were to advance west to Middletown on the dirt Chapel Road, made muddy by a morning rain shower, with his men from the 7th Virginia and probe across the fields toward Strasburg, followed by the rest of the army. The slogging through the mud was laborious and none of the Confederate columns knew what to expect to their front. This force would be coming right at the Maine and Vermont cavalry troopers.

Two miles short of the Front Royal Pike (three-quarters of a mile short of Molly Camel Run), at 09:00, Ashby's scouts had observed an earlier patrol of the 29th Pennsylvania Infantry and 1st Michigan Cavalry who had not seen them. This force had only advanced three mile toward Cedarville when they received a few carbine shots from Ashby's men. Instead of ascertaining who they had met, they retreated hastily to Middletown. A local Unionist who was on Banks' staff, David Hunter Strother, later wrote that they had failed through timidity and incompetence thereby blinding Banks to his true situation. (Note: A native of Martinsburg, Strother was serving as the topographer for Banks.)

Ashby's scouts likewise failed in their mission to report the contact back to Jackson and moved scross the fields to the west along Molly Camel Run toward the a column of smoke at Strasburg and failed to scout further up the road to Middletown. Since he was still ignorant of what lay ahead on the Chapel Road, Jackson had sent his cartographer, Maj. Jedediah Hotchkiss with a small cavalry squad scouting further up Chapel Road toward Middletown while sending word for Ashby to turn his aim from Stasburg to Newtown. Hotchkiss was under instruction to send reports back every half hour. He had only moved one and a half miles and was beginning an ascent up a rise Chapel Road just beyond Molly Camel Run when Douty's videttes posted along the road saw Hotchkiss's party coming along the muddy track. While remaining unobserved, the videttes sent a rider back to warn Douty of an approaching scouting party. Douty moved forward and threw out skirmishers to right and left of the road and sent the men armed with carbines ahead as skirmishers into the woods along the road. He sent riders back to the signal officer in Middletown for relay to Hatch and Banks. He then waited as the enemy closed range with his men.

As Hotchkiss and his men came into range of pistols and carbines, the Maine and Vermont troopers drove them back with heavy fire, and the Confederates retreated out of sight. Douty consulted with Collins and both realized that the woods would prevent them from seeing any flanking movements by the rebels from their position. at 11:00, having seen no more sign of the rebels, Douty called in his skirmish line and left out vedettes in the road and in the fields to keep watch. At the advice of Maj. Collins, he pulled the rest of his small command two miles back toward Middletown to Providence Church (present-day Reliance United Methodist Church) where they were able to see the fields for miles on either side of the road.

Hotchkiss had sent a rider back to report contact to Jackson who again, sent word to Ashby to change direction from Strasburg to Chapel Road.

At 12:00, the vedettes came up the road and rejoined with word that Rebel cavalry and infantry were following them. Within fifteen minutes, Hotchkiss, and his party with two companies of the 8th Louisiana Infantry appeared, halted, and kept out of carbine range. In the ensuing half-hour, the rebels brought up artillery and unlimbered them in the road.

Around 12:45, the rebel artillery opened on Douty and his men and the infantry and dismounted cavalry advanced. Holding fire until the regrouped, reinforced rebels came into range, Douty's men kept up a heavy fire that threw back the enemy, particularly the 21st North Carolina Infantry Regiment from Taylor's Brigade. This led Hotchkiss to believe he was facing a much larger force of infantry in the woods as well as Douty's cavalry astride the road. This managed to buy Banks more time as Jackson sent word to Ewell's Division to halt until he knew against whom he was fighting.

In response, rebel artillery continued firing on the 1st Maine and the now empty woods. This led Douty to bring in his skirmishers and make fighting withdrawal. "stubbornly for every inch of ground" back to Middletown. As they withdrew, the rebels pushed forward. He executed a steady and deliberate withdrawal the four miles back along Chapel Road to Middletown, causing enough uncertainty in Jackson's mind that it delayed the advance by nearly two hours. Under the pressure of the advance, Douty got his command back to Middleton with the loss of a horse. At 14:30 Douty turned off the Chapel Road and onto Church Street a block east of Valley Turnpike. The signal officer on duty told him that Banks had already through and Brig. Gen. Hatch was expected at any moment. Douty led his men into the village of Middletown, south of the crossroads, to wait for Hatch.

The 8th Louisiana now appeared north of town and the accompanying guns of Chew's Battery from Steuart's Brigade began shelling Douty's and Collins' men. Douty was about to call for a withdrawal back to Strasburg when Hatch arrived around 15:30. He deployed Douty and Collins into the side streets and fields east of the turnpike, and waited for 5th New York and the remainder of the 1st Vermont to catch up from burning the last of the stores at Strasburg.

At the same time, Ashby's men appeared on the high ground on their flank to the southeast of town. Despite the macadam, travel along the shoulders had thrown up a great cloud of dust all along the pike. Within minutes, 8th Louisiana Infantry had moved down from the high ground, cut the pike, and began plundering the wagon train while Chew's artillery began firing on wagons further north. Hatch kept Douty's command in a skirmish line to the east between Jackson's Corps and the town. The 1st Battalion and the Vermonters kept the 1st Virginia and 21st North Carolina Infantry at bay.

At 16:00, Hatch realized his command was surrounded when messengers sent to contact Banks' retreating wagon train returned with news that the Valley Pike was blocked by wagons and manned by rebels. Hatch said to Lt. Col. Douty, "We must cut our way through." This was the seed of the 1st Maine's "Middletown Disaster".

===== "The Disaster" =====
Hatch had the 1st Maryland Cavalry and 5th New York Cavalry with him as well as Douty's small command. Col. Charles H Tompkins and the remaining ten companies of the 1st Vermont Cavalry and future Medal of Honor winner Charles H. T. Collis and his independent company of Pennsylvania Zouaves d'Afrique (manning wagons) were still en route from Strasburg. He sent riders back to warn Tompkins and Collis to skirt to the west of Middletown and take back roads to Winchester since the rebels held the Valley Turnpike.

As rebel artillery continued to sporadically fire shells into downtown Middletown, Hatch formed up his brigade along the turnpike by the town square in columns of fours. The 1st Battalion and the 1st Vermont fell in at the rear of the brigade's column at the southern edge of Middletown. Taking the lead, Hatch moved out on the turnpike. Already receiving sporadic rifle fire before going very far, Hatch took the column off the pike onto a dirt road a half-mile out of town. (Note: Believed to be present day Cougill Rd.)

Upon contact with the enemy on this road, Hatch charged and the whole column galloped down the road shooting and slashing at any rebels in their path. This generated a cloud of dust that obscured the turn off the Valley Turnpike. At the head of the column as the charge continued, Hatch saw that Ashby had managed to get one of his batteries behind a wagon barricade back on the turnpike and supported it with elements of the 21st North Carolina. Seeing more rebels moving off the pike and cutting a dirt lane parallel to the pike by several hundred yards, Hatch continued west on his path and smashed through the handful of Ashby's cavalry on that road, bypassing the artillery.

Looking back over the fields, the column could see the two companies of the 1st Vermont followed by the Maine battalion continuing in a charge down the Valley Turnpike. Unfortunately for the 1st Battalion, the huge cloud of dust had obscured the column departing the macadam from Maj. Collins. The rebels had seen them, as well, and a quick-thinking officer on Jackson's staff, 1st. Lt. Douglas quickly rushed a company of infantry to a stonewall in a blocking position over the Turnpike. Lt. Col. Douty had been at the rear seeing to a severely wounded Capt. Cilley of Company B when he noticed the Vermont companies moving out at the trot. When Maj. Collins and two 1st Vermont companies missed the turn and came out of the dust cloud, they saw a rebel battery supported by an infantry blocking the Valley Turnpike. With the stone walls alongside the road leaving no other option, at point-blank range, they charged:

Moving at a rapid rate in sections of four, in a cloud of dust, supposing they wore following their General, coming suddenly upon this battery in a narrow road where it was impossible to maneuver, a terrible scene of confusion followed. Those at the head of the column wore suddenly stopped, those in the roar unable to restrain their horses rushed upon each other, and men and horses were thrown in a confused heap. And as they wore all the while exposed to the shot, and shell, and bayonets, of the enemy, it is not strange that their loss was severe, numbering one hundred and seventy men with an equal number of horses. At the same time companies A and B at a little distance were under a severe fire, during which [Captain] Putnam, and Lieutenant Estes were wounded.

Escaping from this perilous position, Lieut. Colonel Douty fell back on the pike, and taking an intersecting road and making a detour to the left. After a hard march rejoined the main column at Newtown [sic, actually Winchester] the next day, and was immediately ordered to support a battery.

As the column had moved out, Douty had mounted his horse and rode toward the head of the Vermont companies to join Collins. Before passing the last company, the column had already broken into a gallop and "was charging up the pike amid a shower of shell and bullets". He found the dust so thick that he could see nothing but what was close by him. He began seeing men and horses strewn on the wayside. By the time he reached the third company from the end, Company M, the bodies of horses and men, alive and dead, were contained so tightly that they could not continue, and men started retreating. (Note: Collins was taken prisoner and remained in Confederate custody until liberated six days later by 1st Rhode Island Cavalry in Front Royal.) The battalion spilled over the stonewalls and into the surrounding fields cutting their way through the rebels. Many Maine men were unhorsed by the collision with those ahead of them as well as by rebel artillery and musketry. Many these were taken prisoner by Wheat's "Louisiana Tigers" in Taylor's Brigade. Many took off on foot to try to escape. Luckily for those who were able to put some distance between themselves and the enemy, the presence of abandoned wagons from Banks' train loaded with supplies provided a welcome distraction as more and more of Trimble's and Taylor's men left the firing line to rifle through it. This gave Douty and his men the chance to escape. The woods surrounding the fields were noticeably absent of any underbrush that could hide the escaping troopers as they darted between the trunks of the oak trees. While Ashby's cavalry were able to capture some more of the dismounted men, the Maine horseman found that by using pistols and sabers in small groups, they were able to fend off their pursuers who eventually ceased pursuit to join the infantry in the plundering the abandoned wagons.

Douty gathered what men he could and pulled back into Middletown. He reformed his command in the center of town. A company of Ewell's infantry formed up at the southern end of town and opened fire on the New England cavalrymen. Lt. Col. Douty pulled his men back out of their range and turned left down the side-streets and rode west out of Middletown out of sight of the rebels. Eventually, he turned his group north the Middle Road and found Hatch and the brigade after a two-mile gallop.

===== Battle of First Winchester =====
The rest of Hatch's brigade who had seen the debacle across the fields had continued parallel to the Valley Turnpike but found that every time they tried to regain the pike and join Banks, their way was blocked by Ewell's troops. They ended up cutting through Ashby's cavalry and rejoined Banks at Newtown. There Hatch found Col George Henry Gordon and his brigade with five companies of the 1st Michigan Cavalry giving ground slowly. Hatch's men joined in the rear-guard action making Winchester at 22:00, Saturday evening.

At dawn on Sunday, May 25, Brig. Gen. Charles Winder's Stonewall Brigade occupied the hill due south of the town. As Winder attacked down toward Winchester, Banks' artillery soon found their range and began an effective, punishing fire. The 1st Battalion was ordered to provide support for one of these batteries. The Stonewall Brigade stalled in their attack. Jackson ordered Taylor's Brigade to outflank the Union right which they did with a strong charge pushing the right flank back into town. At the same time, Ewell's men got around the extreme left of the Union line. With the impending double envelopment, around 07:00, Banks' line pulled back through the streets of town. The 1st Battalion covered the battery as they limbered up and headed north on the Valley Pike.

As the U.S. troops pulled out of the town, the Maine troopers noted that the local secessionist civilians were jeering them, throwing boiling water, and even shooting at them. Along with the rest of Hatch's brigade, they found themselves fighting their way out of the town under attack from all sides. The vehemence of the local secessionists and Jackson's force climaxed in reports several instances of no quarter being given to some of Banks' wounded who had fallen out of the retreat.

Instead of a wild flight, Jackson later wrote that Banks's troops "preserved their organization remarkably well" through the town. Elated, Jackson rode cheering after the retreating enemy shouting "Go back and tell the whole army to press forward to the Potomac!" Luckily for the 1st Battalion in the rearguard, the Confederate pursuit was ineffective. Ashby and the rest of the rebel cavalrymen had conducted vigorous pursuits of U.S. forces to the south and east. By the time they rejoined Jackson, their horses were blown and men too exhausted to effectively chase down Banks' rearguard leading Jackson to write, "Never was there such a chance for cavalry. Oh that my cavalry was in place!"

As Hatch's brigade swept back and forth at the rear to keep the occasional pursuer at arm's length the outnumbered Federals fled relatively unimpeded for 35 miles in 14 hours, crossing the Potomac River into Williamsport, Maryland after dark around 21:00, Sunday evening. Hatch noted the fine performance of the 1st Maine Cavalry in his post action reports. Among the units in Banks' retreating force for whom the 1st Maine provided a sense of security were their fellow Mainer, the 10th Maine. Union casualties were 2,019 (62 killed, 243 wounded, and 1,714 missing or captured), Confederate losses were 400 (68 killed, 329 wounded, and 3 missing). (Note: Explains that casualty figures are difficult to calculate because the Union forces reported combined losses for Front Royal and First Winchester, amounting to 71 killed, 243 wounded, and 1,714 missing or captured; for those same 3 days, May 23–25, the Confederates reported 68 killed, 329 wounded, and 3 missing.)

===== Aftermath =====
First Winchester had proven costly to the 1st Maine. Several the companies in the 1st Battalion suffered more than half their number as prisoners after the mess in the road with the rebel battery. Company A suffered the most, arriving at Winchester with eighteen men. During this action, the battalion lost three killed, one mortally wounded, nine wounded, twelve wounded and taken prisoner, one mortally wounded and taken prisoner, forty-nine taken prisoner of whom five would die in rebel captivity, and 176 horses and equipment.

Over the next three weeks, many men who had eluded capture or had escaped captivity straggled in to rejoin the regiment. On Tuesday, forty odd men arrived with COL DeForest of the 5th New York Cavalry with thirty-two wagons of supplies that they had managed to spirit away from Confederate hands at Middletown, having been forced by rebel pursuers to cut through the mountains and ford the Potomac upriver by Clear Spring. Some stragglers arrived on foot having lost their mounts in the fighting. A group of twenty had been held in Winchester when they encountered Maj. Whitney and his small command en route to Maj. Gen. Banks on June 3. Additionally, thirty or more of the men being transported south on the Valley Turnpike to captivity in Richmond managed to escape the night of the May 24 and make their way back to the 1st Maine in Maryland. A group of fourteen troopers from Companies A and L managed to report back in to the regiment at Westport on May 27 after escaping through the mountains via Pughtown and Bath. (Note: Some of the men were mounted on horses that originally belonged to other U.S. and rebel cavalrymen.)

Several members of the command made their way to Harper's Ferry and thence to the regiment at Williamsport.

All the while, starting with the first letters home, there was much confusion regarding the dead, wounded, and missing. Capt. Cilley was mistakenly reported dead in several letters. This confusion was unfortunately common during the war.

In Williamsport, while Douty worked diligently remounting his command, the news of Banks's ouster from the Valley caused a stir in Washington lest Jackson continue north and threaten the capital. Lincoln, who in the absence of a general in chief (Note: McClellan was relieved of his position as general in chief in March to concentrate on the field operations of his Army of the Potomac.) was exercising day to day strategic control over his armies in the field, took aggressive action in response. He planned trap on Jackson using three armies. Frémont's would move to Harrisonburg on Jackson's supply line, Banks would move back in the Valley, and 20,000 men under McDowell would move to Front Royal and attack Jackson driving him against Frémont at Harrisonburg.

Unfortunately, this plan was complex and required synchronized movements by separate commands. Banks declared his army was too shaken to move. It would remain north of the Potomac until June 10. Frémont and McDowell bungled it completely. Jackson defeated the two in detail – Frémont at the Battle of Cross Keys on June 8 and McDowell at Battle of Port Republic on June 9. Of note, one of the 1st Maine's nemeses, Turner Ashby died on Chestnut Ridge near Harrisonburg in a skirmish with Frémont's cavalry.

On June 12, the 1st Battalion crossed the Potomac and returned to Winchester. Company K continued down the Valley Pike to Strasburg. Companies E and M traveled south on the also macadam Front Royal-Winchester Road to Front Royal, where they were joined on the 20th by companies A and B, and the brigade (Note: Hatch placed subordinate to Crawford.) placed attached to Brig. Gen. Crawford's infantry brigade. (Note: 5th Connecticut, 10th Maine, 28th New York, and 46th Pennsylvania.) The remainder of Lt. Col. Douty's command's time in the Shenandoah was uneventful save a brief skirmish at Milford, on July 2 (Capt. Thaxter commanding). On July 9, Douty received orders to rejoin the regiment at Warrenton.

==== In the Department of the Rappahannock ====
The main body of the regiment had remained in Washington, DC while the 1st Battalion operated in and around the Shenandoah Valley. On April 2, 1862, orders arrived for a march to Warrenton, VA on Friday, April 4. The troopers spent Thursday sharpening their sabers and checking their equipment. When their departure was delayed by a day, the regiment continued honing their edged weapons. On Friday evening, the men were given a patriotic send-off including a concert sung by ladies from Maine who were residing in Washington.

At midday Saturday, the regiment departed their encampment on Capitol Hill led by Maj. Stowell (Allen was still recuperating in New York). The inexperienced regiment "accompanied by a baggage train long enough for a whole corps later in the war", rode down Maryland Avenue SW and crossed the Potomac on Long Bridge.

===== Into rebel territory =====
On the Virginia side, it checked in at Fort Runyon. (Note: Largest of the Washington Forts, built in 1861, it guarded the Virginia side of the Long Bridge as well as the Columbia and Washington-Alexandria Turnpikes.) At the fort, they received orders to report to Brig. Gen. McDowell's Department of the Rappahannock's forces at Warrenton Junction (present day Calverton, Virginia) via the Columbia, Little River, and Warrenton Turnpikes. The regiment crossed the Alexandria Canal and climbed up the Columbia Turnpike passing Fort Albany (Note: Fort Albany was built to mutually support Runyon and control the Columbia Turnpike.) on the left as they crested the rise. The regiment continued on and could see Robert E Lee's home, Arlington House on a rise to the right. The men of the 1st Maine were taking in the sights as they traveled for the first time in rebel territory.

The first impressions of Virginia were not very favorable. The roads were muddy and in bad order, and houses were few, far between, not particularly good, even before the war, and now presenting a dilapidated, tumble-clown appearance. The whole country wore a deserted, unhealthy look, to which the earthworks, abandoned camp-grounds, and the waste and destruction which accompany an army, even when not in active operation, added an extra gloom.

— Edward P. Tobie (Note: Although macadamized, the Columbia Turnpike was getting worn from its constant use by Federal forces.)

Here the men saw for the first time the desolating effects of war. On their line of march to and from this point nearly every house, was deserted of its owners. Its doors and its windows and the fences that enclosed it, and the birds that sang and the flowers that bloomed around it, all were gone. The music of singing birds and the sweeter music of children's voices had ceased ... The pleasant dwellings had been left desolate, and no cheerful salutations of neighbors and no ringing laugh of youthful glee was heard. Instead of these the streets resounded with the roll of the drum, the stern word of command and the heavy tramp of armed men

— Samuel H. Merrill, Chaplain, 1st Maine Cavalry

As Lee's home faded into the distance, the men descended a small vale to Arlington Mills Station crossing both 4 Mile Run and the Alexandria, Loudoun, and Hampshire Railroad (AL&H). (Note: Originally intended to cross the Blue Ridge Mountains and the Shenandoah River to reach the coal fields in the western part of Hampshire County. When the war started it only reached Leesburg in Loudoun County.) The men noted heavy use of the railway as they crossed it seeing other troops and supplies at the station. (Note: Because of its proximity to Washington, D.C., the line saw much use and disruption during the war.) A mile beyond the railway and above the dell, at 15:00, the regiment briefly stopped at Bailey's Crossroads to water their horses. They had taken three hours to travel the nine miles from the encampment on Capitol Hill to the crossroads. Once the horses were watered, the regiment mounted up and continued down Columbia Turnpike. At Padgett's Tavern, the regiment turned right on the Little River Turnpike another macadamized road. They crossed the unfinished new rail cut that would run from the Orange and Alexandria Railroad through Annandale and Fairfax to Haymarket. By sunset on Saturday, April 5, 1862, the 1st Maine had reached Fairfax Courthouse.

The men in the regiment were familiar with the history of the courthouse "where the eloquence of a Patrick Henry and a ·William ·Wirt bad exerted its magic power. (Note: The history of the American Revolution was commonly known throughout the United States during the Civil War as it was still very much in common memory. Virginia's part in the Revolution was very much known to the common trooper in the regiment.)" While dismayed at its state of ruin, the troopers still were fascinated by the building, the grounds, and the various remnants of the county records strewn about the location. Picketing the horses in the Courthouse's yards, the troopers were crammed into the Courthouse's various buildings.

The regiment was up at dawn on Sunday morning, April 6. By 09:00, they had groomed their horses, broke fast, and were on the Little River Turnpike once more heading west. A mile down the pike, the command made a left turn in the village of Germantown and rode onto the Warrenton Turnpike heading west-southwest where Centreville, VA lay six miles away. They continued passing vacant fields on either side of the road. Ahead on a slight ridge on either side of the pike, the men saw some of the rebel "Quaker guns," manned with stuffed dummies that the rebels had placed there to give their pickets on the rise the look of a fortified position from the distance. At noon they passed them and entered Centreville. A water halt was made there for the horses, and after seeing to their mounts, the men inspected the effigies with great interest. Within an hour, the command had remounted and left Warrenton Pike and turned onto a dirt road heading south to Manassas Junction. Shortly, they found themselves crossing Bull Run over a partially rebuilt bridge which had been destroyed by the Confederates when they retreated. Although on the edge of the battlefield, the Maine men saw solitary chimneys where houses used to be. Dead rotting horses generated "that peculiar stench which afterwards became familiar to all soldiers". As the march continued, many a Maine trooper was sobered by the sight of numerous soldiers' graves on the roadside along Warrenton Turnpike. At dark the regiment was at Manassas Junction. Their horses were picketed by the side of the road and the men had their first experience (of many) in sleeping out-of-doors. The weather was fair, and morale was high, and the "boys, though tired, were in good spirits, and inclined to make the best of the circumstances. The command had marched 17 miles from Fairfax Courthouse.

Monday, April 7, 1862, was a gray, drizzly day, as the 1st Maine traveled along the dirt road that paralleled the Orange & Alexandria past Bristoe Station and Catlett's Station all the way to Warrenton Junction. They saw ripe wheat fields and fine manors, all abandoned. It started drizzling in the late morning, and after a midday water stop, the rain increased. The muddy road and numerous fords over creeks made the march a difficult one, but after twelve miles, around 15:00 they reported to McDowell's Department of the Rappahannock in Warrenton Junction. The baggage train were still on the dirt road having been held up at a ford that was too deep for their transit.

===== Training and patrolling =====
First assigned to Gen. Abercrombie's brigade, and soon afterwards to Gen. Ord's division within McDowell's department, the 1st Maine was learning its job. The occasional patrols were the primary means for this on-the-job-training. Companies were detached singly, in twos, threes, and more to conduct these reconnaissances. Friday, April 11, they spent the night scouting Warrenton and returned Saturday morning. They made several more such patrols through the remainder of April and into May. In this time, they became adept at river-crossings, bringing the right amount of gear for a mission, and handling their horses while also learning how valuable a source of intelligence both the enslaved and free black population would be.

On Tuesday, April 15, Company C under Capt. Dyer made a patrol down the Orange & Alexandria to the Rappahannock where they saw black slaves building earthworks on the opposite side of the river north of the railroad. As they moved north, they could see a large, white plantation house which they surmised to be the rebel headquarters. Two slaves who had escaped across the river estimated that there were between 5,000 and 7,000 troops total in the area. Examination of the field works through binoculars led Dyer to believe they alone could hold 3,000–4,000 men. As they turned to report back, three rebel batteries opened fire on them. After getting out of range and sight of the rebels, they learned from some black women the identities of several locals who were visiting their camp and reporting back to the rebels.

The next evening, Wednesday, April 16, Lt. Col. Willard Sayles, commander of the 1st Rhode Island Cavalry, took a squadron of his regiment and Companies D and F of the 1st Maine on a patrol toward Liberty Church to interrogate and arrest the reported rebel informants. After receiving accurate intelligence from the suspects' slaves, three men were arrested and turned over to the brigade headquarters.

On Tuesday, April 22, Col. Allen rejoined his command. The regiment was being moved around and attached to various infantry brigades. Sometimes various companies were detached for provost or courier duties. Other than these command duties their time was spent on picket duty and scouting patrols for their various attached commands. Their constant reassignment led, by mid-May, to the common query among the men, "whose kite are we going to be tail to next?" In fact, this problem affected not only the 1st Maine but all volunteer cavalry regiments in the eastern theater. The Army of the Potomac's cavalry would not serve as a unified force until the upcoming Maryland Campaign.

===== Culpeper reconnaissance =====
The only patrol where the regiment operated as one body was a reconnaissance patrol to Culpeper Court House on Sunday, May 4, 1862, through Monday, May 5. Under Brig. Gen. Hartsuff's direction, the 1st Maine took up their line of march Sunday, May 4, 1862, at 17:00, for reconnaissance to the Rappahannock River and beyond Culpeper Courthouse. The expedition was led by Maj. Stowell due to Col. Allen's continued infirmity. and the men were tasked with bringing three days rations with them. After proceeding en miles in the darkness, Stowell halted at 20:30 and obtained a local Unionist as guide who took them two miles further to the road along the north side of the Rappahannock. The command then took this road two miles further north to Beverly's Ford. With the water up to five feet deep and a strong current, the regiment did not finish crossing until midnight. (Note: Merrill reported despite strong current, the only patrol member to get immersed during the crossing was the Surgeon, George W. Colby. Tobie reported that the difficulty of this fording taught the men so well that they never had another issue fording streams for the remainder of the war.)

The guide suggested that the best place for a horse and water was the Cunningham plantation, or Elkwood Plantation, Farley Hill, by Farley Road over Ruffian's Run, the late headquarters of the Confederate Army. Around 01:00, the command gained access to the main house from the overseer who provided valuable intelligence on the geography of Culpeper County and the local rebel order of battle.

At 04:00, the 1st Maine resumed their march, with the overseer guiding them. Instead of taking a dirt track (present day Farley Road) which went through a wood and low land, Stowell accepted the guide's suggestion to ride along Fleetwood Hill that gave a view of the river and railroad as well as of the surrounding country, thus precluding being surprised by the enemy. Pushing on toward Brandy Station, Stowell had thrown out a company of skirmishers and a formidable rear guard, which covered more than a mile of the country.

Stowell found the general appearance of the country favorable, gently rolling, open, highly cultivated, and fruitful, rich plantations, with an abundance of forage and subsistence. He noted the brush was much heavier than about Warrenton Junction. After crossing the river, the men had found no real road leading south and on their left until they arrived at Brandy Station. There they found remains of an old plank road, connecting the Fredericksburg and Culpeper Plank Roads with the Old Carolina and Kelly's Ford Roads.

The patrol found that the rebels on the Rappahannock had fallen back to Gordonsville, and there has been no force this side of there of any great amount. Stowell noted that the "planters on our route, as near as I could judge, are nearly all secesh [sic], and a little bleeding would reduce their fever a little and do them good."

Advancing on from Brandy Station to Culpeper Court House around 09:00, the 1st Maine found that the middle and upper classes were secessionist who could not be trusted to give accurate information, but that the blacks and poor whites were exceptionally reliable, giving corroboration, and very willing to give all the intelligence they had. Two miles beyond Brandy Station, Stowell heard that a line of pickets was established about three miles this side of Culpeper, ergo about two miles ahead of them. Further interrogation of a civilian intercepted coming from the courthouse indicated that the rebels there were two companies of cavalry all equipped with carbines.

After leaving this man by the wayside and advancing about one mile, at 10:15, Stowell received a messenger from Capt. Taylor commander of L Company, the advance guard, that LT Vaughan had found the pickets, charged them, put them to flight, and now Company L and Taylor were chasing them down the railroad. Stowell ordered the column forward as fast as possible. On arriving within a half-mile of the town, he detached men to high ground to the north and south of town to avoid surprises. He next sent two companies forward to support Taylor and Company L which had continued pursuit through the town and out the other side. The men on the high ground reported seeing horses being driven into a yard northwest of town. Stowell sent Capt. Smith forward to investigate.

Not having heard from either Taylor or Smith, Stowell kept the command spread out while he and Company C searched the courthouse and questioned the civilians. While the men in Culpeper were "sour-looking and reserved", they again found that the black people and handful of Unionists and poor whites were reliable sources. According to the friendly locals, the regiment's approach generated quite a stir, and two couriers immediately rode to the Rapidan, some eight miles beyond Culpeper, for two regiments of infantry which were stationed there. Stowell also learned that the rebels mounted the horses without regard to ownership, and very many without stopping to saddle them. The man intercepted and interrogated on the way in had proven to be accurate as per the composition of the force posted at the courthouse

Considering the short distance to the two regiments of rebel infantry (they were just a few stations up the Orange & Alexandria rail line) and not hearing from Capt. Taylor, Stowell became concerned about the regiment's quite critical situation. While searching stables and yards for horses to seize, the returned Capt. Smith and several company and platoon officers alerted him to a force of cavalry on the south side of the town. Initially thought to be rebels as the force had light-colored horses and some of it light clothing, it turned out to be Capt. Taylor. He had taken some prisoners were riding some of the light-colored horses and dressed in light clothing. (Note: All of 1st Maine's horses were dark colored apart from the band. The prisoners were armed but in civilian clothes and two were recognized as local visitors to the regiment's encampment at Warrenton Junction. Of note, one of the prisoners, and old man thought to be of little use to the rebels and so released, ended up being one of the clerks processing Maine troopers captured at Brandy Station a year later.)

At 11:00, after finding no papers of great consequence except a handful of rifles, carbines, shotguns, and pistols, the command began its trek back to its base. Stowell remarked that by following the railroad, they could tear up the track at any time if the cars should approach us with infantry. Stopping at Jonas Run about 13:30 to water and feed their horses, and then returned to the Rappahannock by 16:30. Stowell deemed it unwise to stop on the south side for the night, lest rebel infantry catch them by railroad. Since only their cavalry could ford the river, which the Maine troopers did not fear, Stowell turned the column north along the riverbank toward Beverly's Ford as it started top rain. (Note: The rebels destroyed the O & A railroad bridge across the Rappahannock on their retreat from Manassas.)

Arriving about 18:30, the command began across finding the water about higher than the night before and consequently a difficult two-hour evolution. Originally intending on camping on the north side for the night, Stowell found a consensus to push on home through the stormy weather twelve miles farther.

Stowell cleared the last of his men into camp and reported to Col. Allen at 23:00. While not encountering any meaningful contact, the 1st Maine had successfully scouted the furthest distance south over the Rappahannock of any United States unit thus far in the war covering 60 miles over the course of 31 hours and returning with confirmed enemy order of battle, transportation infrastructure intelligence, enemy supply/logistics status, and eight prisoners. The command was duly praised for its competence and professionalism.

===== Move to Falmouth =====
After several successful foraging and scouting expeditions that netted a handful of prisoners, on Friday, May 9, the brigade, now commanded by Brig. Gen. Hartsuff, received orders to pack its gear and move to Falmouth, opposite Fredericksburg on the Rappahannock, twenty-five miles to the southeast. On Monday, May 12 at noon, the brigade departed Warrenton. The five companies of the 1st Maine served as advance and rear guards during the march.

At 17:00, after traveling eight miles, Companies D, K, and L, the advance guard, halted and set camp. (Note: Merrill and Tobie seemed to indicate this stop as in the vicinity of the junction of Virginia state routes 616 and 609 in present-day Catlett, Virginia.) The brigade found the travel very difficult, and the rear guard did not arrive at camp until 21:30 Monday evening.

Reveille at 04:00 got the men up to care for their horses and prepare for the day's march. Companies C, F, G, and I rotated to take the advance guard on Tuesday and were stepping out at 06:30. After all the infantry and wagons got out of the camp, D, K, and L finally got on the road at 08:30. The Maine cavalrymen noted the number of "large plantations of rare beauty" along the march. May 13, 1862, was a hot and humid day and the heat almost insufferable, with a dense cloud of dust that made the horses in front of the troopers almost invisible. The infantry in the brigade suffered greatly as the column spun out for miles. The advance guard halted at Stafford Court House at 14:00, but the rear companies did not arrive until 18:30. The men in the brigade were impressed with the relatively untouched countryside, quite amid the spring green, as they passed through.

As the column had progressed during the day, they had attracted a large following of escaped slaves, or "contraband", who seized their freedom by joining the column. Again, these local black residents proved exceedingly valuable sources of intelligence.

The next morning, the Maine troopers rose earlier than their exhausted infantry brothers to prepare their horses for the last leg of the journey south to Falmouth. Again, the companies rotated between advance and rear guard and resumed the march with an awake and fed infantry by 07:00. Within an hour that Wednesday morning, it began raining which spared the brigade from the heat of the day before but added a wet chill to the march.

Hartsuff's brigades's advance guard of Companies D, K, and L reached Falmouth, on the opposite side of the Rappahannock from Fredericksburg, by mid afternoon. The remainder of the brigade streamed in until 20:00.The march of 30 miles through Virginia mud had been difficult. Nearly half of the infantry fallen out by the wayside at some point of the march. Despite the rigor, the 1st Maine troopers noticed several large, beautiful plantations, indicating fine taste. They also noticed again the support and value of the local black population as intelligence sources. The column had met many groups of slaves acting as agents of their own emancipation by escaping to Federal lines.

===== Falmouth and the Shenandoah Valley =====
Through April and May of that spring, the men of the 1st Maine had followed the progress of McClellan in his Peninsula Campaign through the Northern newspaper available in camp as well as the enemy press available along the route of march. The forces at Fredericksburg were commanded by McDowell to block any advance on Washington and to tie down Confederate troops marking them across the river at Fredericksburg. While the confederates had reduced their numbers at Fredericksburg, the U.S. forces increased in number yet did not advance.

While at Falmouth, Hartsuff's brigade with Rickett's brigade now formed a division under a prior commander, Ord, Ord's division was reviewed by Gen. McDowell, and three days later, Friday, May 23, President Lincoln, accompanied by Secretary of War Stanton, M. Mercier, the French Minister, and other distinguished gentlemen, as well as by Mrs. Lincoln, Mrs. Stanton, and other ladies, reviewed McDowell's whole force. In camp at Falmouth, the regiment received new shelter tents (today known as pup tents) so that every two men would always he supplied with a tent for shelter. Despite initial misgivings, the troopers eventually found them much better tents than their original ten- and twelve man tents.

Sunday, May 25, the regiment, with the 2nd Maine Light Battery (Capt. James A. Hall), the 5th Maine Light Battery (Capt. George F. Leppien), and the 1st Pennsylvania Light Battery (Capt. Ezra W. Matthews), all under command of Col. Allen, marched to Alexandria. The command was in motion at 18:00 in the evening, and after a tedious march went into bivouac on the road at 23:30, having made five miles in as many hours, owing to continuous delays caused by the artillery and wagons getting stuck in the mud. By 07:00, they were on the road to Alexandria again. At 12:00, however, a courier caught up with Col. Allen with orders for them to march to Manassas Junction instead. Allen had the small command go into camp planning on an early start on Tuesday.

McDowell had received reports of the rebels in considerable force near Centreville, and he decided to consolidate his forces at Manassas. On the road by 05:00, the regiment and three batteries bivouacked on the roadside on Tuesday evening and made Manassas by midday, Wednesday, May May 28, joining the remainder of McDowell's corps, camping there that night.

On Thursday morning, Washington ordered McDowell to the Shenandoah Valley to assist Banks so the whole force, with the 1st Maine in the advance, took up the line of march for Front Royal. Washington was intent on this force cutting Jackson's force off in the lower valley between McDowell and Banks.The regiment passed through Thoroughfare Gap and camped Thursday night on the other side of the Blue Ridge Mountains. On Friday, they went fifteen miles further and camped on the estate of the late Chief Justice Marshall, and the third day, Saturday, May 31, reached Front Royal at dark in the rain camping just outside the village on the Manassas Gap Road.

===== Maj. Whitney's mission =====
One week prior to the 1st Maine's arrival as part of Ord's Division, Saturday, May 24, Jackson's forces, after demolishing the 1st Maryland Cavalry at Front Royal, had met their brethren in the 1st Battalion with Lieut. Col. Douty and driven Banks' army up the other side of the valley to Winchester following up with driving Banks further out of the valley and across the Potomac into Maryland on Sunday. At Front Royal, the regiment met a handful of their comrades from the 1st Battalion who had been captured after The Disaster with Maj. Collins from the 1st Vermont. The day before, Friday May 30, the 1st Rhode Island had liberated these men when aj. Gen. Shields' forces retook the town. Unknown to the regiment, more of their comrades were being held temporarily at several locations in the valley.

At Front Royal, McDowell, now in command, found it very important to open communication with Banks, who had moved downriver from Williamsport to Harper's Ferry at the lower end of the valley. On Sunday, before his arrival, Shields had heard the artillery fire from Jackson's clash with Fremont at Fisher's Hill but refrained from moving to his assistance because he wanted to wait for McDowell and all of his forces to arrive. While he now knew Jackson may have slipped away at Strasburg, he also wanted to get a picture of the disposition of Confederate forces between him and Winchester, specifically if Jackson and his main body of troops were still threatening Washington. Accordingly, the next day Monday, June 2, he ordered a small force to attempt to make contact. Col. Allen upon receiving the orders sent Maj. Whitney with Companies C and D to reconnoiter in that direction, and if possible, open a line of communicate with Banks. The mission was risky as the rebels now commanded the valley.

Whitney and his little command started late in the afternoon at 16:00. In moderate rain, they traveled up the macadamized Front Royal-Winchester Road, passing through Cedarville and Nineveh without seeing any enemy. The sun set at 19:30 and with the mountains' shadows, it was too dark to continue so Whitney halted his men in the woods about two miles from Winchester. They had heard from the local black population that the Confederates were holding Winchester but that Jackson's main body had already slipped into Strasburg the same day they had arrived ten miles away. This would be valuable intelligence for both Banks and McDowell as well as the fact that they had not seen any rebels troops during their journey in the rain. They remained in the woods that night in a driving rain without fires to hide their presence from the enemy. Without shelter, they were "cold, wet, and decidedly uncomfortable", but the Maine troopers knew the storm and darkness were advantageous to their dangerous mission.

At early dawn, Tuesday, the command dashed into town and through it, creating a complete surprise to the rebel force of about 300 who held the town. This force was left by Jackson to guard about 200 Union soldiers captured by Jackson's forces the week before including a handful of 1st Maine troopers, The rebels had not expected any threat between them and Jackson's main body and failed to put pickets south of the town. They were completely surprised as well as the local citizenry who remembering, "their barbarous conduct toward the retreating troops of General Banks, a few days before, they anticipated a fearful retribution." (Note: Several memoirs and letters to The First Maine Bugle/Maine Bugle recalled the harassment and mistreatment of prisoners and local Unionists at the hands of local rebel civilians. Instances of no quarter given to wounded Federals also had been reported.) As the little force, at an hour when few in the town were stirring, swept like a whirlwind into the town, they were very naturally supposed' to be the advance of a heavy force.

The consternation and frightened looks and actions of soldiers and citizens, as well as the joyous surprise of the prisoners, amused the Maine troopers. The panic seized rebel soldiers and the civilians that beds were suddenly vacated, toilets neglected, garments forgotten or ludicrously adjusted, and rebel soldiers threw down their arms in dismay while others took safety in flight. Taking advantage of the enemy's sudden panic and disorganization, many prisoners with their wits about them took off north on the road to Harper's Ferry where friendly forces lay. A few of these men were some captured from Lt. Col. Douty's battalion at Middletown Several of these men obtained mounts and joined Whitney's expedition.

The whole number of Union prisoners in the town might have been liberated, but since this was not in the mission's orders, Whitney did not stop to do so. His first objective of the mission to scout between Front Royal and Winchester was accomplished. The orders being next to communicate with Banks and not stop to fight, Whitney's command pushed on. Whitney found a local guide who stated that a rebel force was in camp just beyond Winchester, but instead, after marching a few miles he found Banks' pickets who told him Banks was now at Harper's Ferry. He soon reached the general's headquarters by 10:00, delivered his orders, received new ones, dropped off the liberated Maine troopers with Lieut. Col. Douty, and started back on the return to Front Royal. Around 17:00, the command once again swept through Winchester again causing confusion and camped in the same woods On Tuesday night that they had on Monday night. (Note: Retracing their route was faster than skirting the feet of the Blue Ridge mountains via Summit Point and Berryville as they would be traveling on a macadamized road in the wet weather) Rising at dawn's light on June 4, the command lit off on the road to Front Royal and met no rebel forces along the way. Arriving by 11:00 a.m., Whitney reported with Col. Allen to Maj. Gen. McDowell with Banks' messages and his report on rebel dispositions between Front Royal and Winchester.

On that Wednesday, the same day, as a result of Whitney's report of only the handful of rebels at Winchester, Banks moved his command back into Winchester. Entering the town, the U.S. troops found "not a solitary person appeared in sight, but hundreds of unfriendly eyes were peering through all manner of crevices, expecting momentarily to see the torch applied to all places whence shots had been fired and hot water thrown on the morning of the twenty-fifth day of May." In this action, Whitney's colleagues in the 1st Battalion scouted up the Valley Turnpike for Banks.

===== Separated in the Valley and reunited at Warrenton =====
Although all of the elements of the regiment were now operating in the Shenandoah, the army kept them attached to their respective operational commands. Douty and his battalion remained with Banks until after the holiday on the 4th of July. Their days were filled with picket duty, patrolling, scouting, and dispatch riding punctuated by numerous skirmishes of which only the one June 24 merited a mention in official reports. Meanwhile, the rest of the regiment under Col. Allen remained with McDowell's forces at Front Royal.

Both locations sent out constant scouting patrols. The Federal forces were in the northern, lower valley around Front Royal and Winchester while the Rebels were in the southern, upper valley around Harrisonburg. The large portion of the valley on either side of Massanutten Mountain was held sporadically by cavalry patrols from Banks and McDowell, and by cavalry and guerrillas by the Confederates. This fluid situation led to men of the regiment taking several prisoners unaware of their presence and, thanks to the support of the local black population escaping the reciprocal situation.

On June 17, the Maj. Stowell was sent with a squadron consisting of Companies K, G, and I returned to Manassas Junction from Front Royal attached to a brigade led by Brig. Gen. Hartsuff. . The men in this squadron had an uneventful trek lightened by passing through groves of cherry trees which they scoured of its harvest with the permission of the general. By the 20 June, they were based in Warrenton where Col. Allen and the rest of .

Douty's battalion remained with Banks. On Sunday, June 29, Companies A (Capt. Thaxter), B (Capt. Tucker), and H (Capt. Summat)reported to Col. Tompkins commander of the 1st Vermont Cavalry. McDowell had ordered Brig. Gen. Crawford to make a reconnaissance from Front Royal up the valley to see of there were any substantial Rebel forces in Luray. Tompkins was to be his cavalry commander with five companies of the 1st Vermont, three companies of the 1st Maine, and two battalions of the 1st Michigan. Crawford's main force was his infantry brigade. The combined force made Milford by nightfall. On Monday at 08:00, Crawford's cavalry force surprised 200 Rebel cavalry in Luray just as they were getting ready to depart. They pushed them on down the road toward Luray, but found themselves outranged by the rifle-muskets of their opponents as they were armed with sabers, pistols, and only a handful of carbines. The troopers felt that with enough carbines they might have routed their foes, but instead they withdrew back to Crawford in Milford. After gathering intelligence from local Unionists and slaves and seeing no further signs of Confederate forces, Crwaford returned to Front Royal to report in.

The 4th of July was celebrated in both armies in camp with food, games, and patriotic speeches. Both locations continued learning and perfecting their craft by constantly patrolling and picketing.

The regiment was reunited at Warrenton, VA, on July 10, and attached to Bayard's brigade, with which it took part in the Battle of Cedar Mountain. This was the unit's first encounter with elements of the Army of Northern Virginia, albeit only a portion under the command of Stonewall Jackson. Due to the confusion and the large number of prisoners taken in the valley in May and June, forty or more 1st Maine troopers who were being transported to Richmond at this time succeeded in escaping and eluding their guards and rejoined the company in a day or two.

==== General Pope's Campaign ====
Jackson's Valley Campaign had been conducted to relieve the pressure caused by McClellan's Peninsula Campaign had opened in April, but his advance had been so slow that the Rebels had ample time to run a campaign like Jackson's against Banks. While Banks and McDowell thought they had driven him down the valley, Jackson had returned with his troops, flushed with success, to the main Rebel army, now known as the Army of Northern Virginia under Robert E. Lee, to fall "like a thunderbolt" upon the right wing of McClellan's army in front of Richmond, and to fight in the Seven Days Battles.

On June 26, 1862, the very day the seven days fight before Richmond began, the forces under Banks, Fremont, and McDowell, which had been acting independently, were consolidated into one army, the Army of Virginia under Major General Pope's command. The 1st Maine was initially assigned to Brig. Gen. Duryée's 1st Brigade, Brig. Gen. Ricketts' 2nd Division of McDowell's III Corps of the Army of Virginia, but Pope stopped assigning cavalry regiments to brigades and formed them into brigades of four or five regiments assigned to a corps and reporting directly to the corps commander. The men of the 1st Maine saw this as an improvement in their use.

The second half of July saw the local streams flooded by several heavy rainfalls. On July 18, Maj. Whitney commanding a squadron of Companies G, I, and K, started reconnaissance across the Rappahannock in a pelting rain storm. After a ride of fifteen miles the river was reached at 15:00, but it was too swollen to cross, so the patrol sheltered in some unoccupied houses at Rappahannock Station. With the river still impassable the next day, Whitney returned to camp that evening. His patrol found out from the pickets that all the streams in the vicinity were flooded, so much so that LT Cary and his squad from Company K, who had been relieved from picket on 18 July, could not get back to camp until the afternoon of the next day.

The last ten days of July were filled with scouting to the Rapidan River and to Madison and the Rapidan River which the troopers of the 1st Maine always found picketed in strength by Stuart's cavalry. On July 22, the 1st Maine was detached from the brigade and sent with Rickett's 2nd Division to Waterloo Bridge to reinforce Maj. Gen. Shields, who was expecting an attack from Jackson. The regiment remained there scouting down to the Rapidan and west to Front Royal until August 5 when it marched to Culpeper Court House to rejoin Bayard's Brigade. (Note: Waterloo Bridge was the point where the Warrenton-Sperryville turnpike crossed the Upper Rappahannock.)

Pope, meanwhile, had begun moving toward Richmond via Culpepper.General Robert E. Lee responded to Pope's dispositions by dispatching Major General Thomas J. "Stonewall" Jackson with 14,000 men to Gordonsville on July 13. Jackson was later reinforced with another 10,000 men by Maj. Gen. A.P. Hill's division on July 27. On August 6, Pope moved south to capture the rail junction at Gordonsville, thereby relieving the pressure on Maj. Gen. McClellan's withdrawal from the Virginia Peninsula. The 1st Maine moved to Culpeper Court House and scouted the Rapidan.

===== Cedar Mountain =====
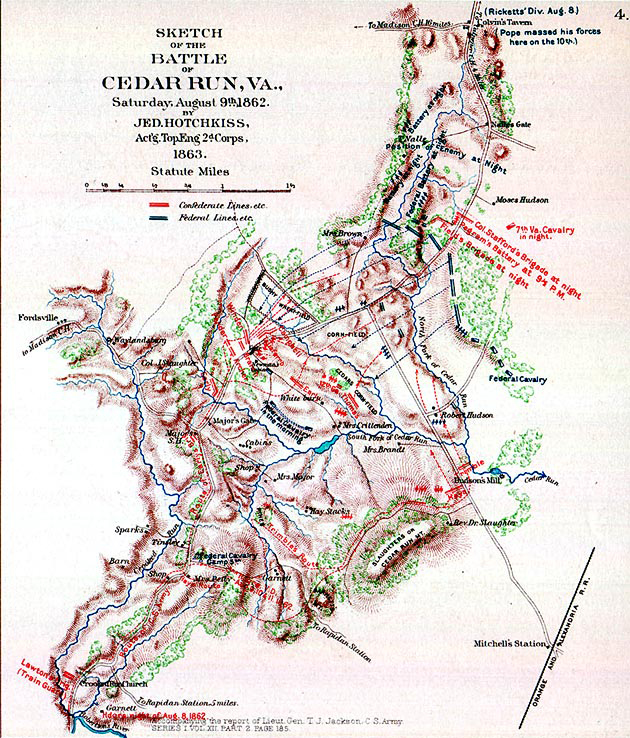
Sketch of Battle of Cedar Run

In response to Pope's threat, Jackson chose to go on the offensive, attacking Pope's vanguard under Banks with local superiority in numbers, before the entire Army of Virginia could be brought to bear on his force. After defeating Banks, he then hoped to move on Culpeper Court House to keep Pope's army separated to allow him to defeat the Federal forces in detail, as he had done during the Valley Campaign. On August 7, Jackson set out for Culpeper. The cavalry under Brig. Gen. Beverly Robertson was sent ahead to dispatch the Federal cavalry guarding the fords of the Rapidan River and occupying Madison Court House, threatening Jackson's left flank as his force marched across the Rapidan at Walker's and Cave's Fords and moved northward. Robertson's men cleared the flanks by daylight.

Initial reports of the pickets of Jackson's crossing were disbelieved, but the 1st Maine's brigade commander, Bayard went for to look himself and saw Jackson's corps already across the river in force. He immediately sent messengers to report the crossing to Banks and Pope and recalled all his pickets along the river including those manned by the 1st Maine at Raccoon Ford. (Note: Several of the 1st Maine's pickets including all of Company D had to take some circuitous routes through the woods to return to the regiment while evading Stuart's cavalry. Company D finally reunited with the regiment on the morning of the battle, August 9.) He ordered the 1st Pennsylvania to fight a delaying action as he concentrated his brigade and staged a fighting withdrawal toward Culpeper .

A British correspo0ndent was with Banks' infantry's lead elements that had arrived near Cedar Mountain, and he wrote:

As we advanced, regiments of cavalry returning reported that the enemy was hard by. The infantry at once broke into prolonged cheers, and the brigade band commenced, "Hail Columbia ! Much of the Federal cavalry was wretchedly made up; but there was a Maine regiment of broad, long-armed swordsmen, whose equals I have never seen. In this regiment, the horses of each company were of a distinct colour. There was a regiment of lancers, likewise, whose pennons gave them a picturesque appearance. They were noted mainly for tumbling from their saddles. Ambulances followed the brigade; and many a cheek paled in contemplation of these sombre vehicles.

When about five miles out of Culpepper, we came to the base of Cedar, or Slaughter's Mountain. Ambulances were here wheeled into a field, batteries unlimbered and advanced, and infantry formed in double line across the country, with skirmishers thrown out in front. Disorder ceased; discipline prevailed. The sun set upon four thousand men, lying vigilantly upon their arms, and all looking through the twilight at a point on the mountain, where, from the roof of a white house, floated a speck of canvas—the Southern flag. ...

The fog had risen from Cedar Mountain when I woke, and the flag still waved defiantly over Slaughter's house. My attention was called to a battery half-way up the ascent, and I made out with the glass a signal station on the peak.

Two factors now slowed Jackson's advance, there was a severe heat wave over Virginia at the beginning of August 1862, and his characteristic secrecy about his plans caused confusion among his subordinates. As such, the head of his column had only progressed 8 miles (13 km) by the evening of August 8. In response, Pope ordered Sigel to Culpeper Court House to reinforce Banks, and Banks was ordered to maintain a defensive line on a ridge above Cedar Run, 7 miles (11 km) south of Culpeper Court House and, just to the north-west of Cedar Mountain. Banks ordered Bayard and Buford to place their cavalry his front across the north fork of Cedar Run.

====== The morning ======
Col. Allen drew up the 1st Maine in line of battle at 0600, on the left of the Culpeper-Orange Turnpike (present day U.S. Route 15), just beyond a cornfield, and facing Rebels who were about one and a quarter mile distant. The cavalry screen was in place by 0630 on August 9. At 11:00, being tasked by Bayard with protecting the left flank, Allen moved the regiment some 300 yards to the extreme left, posting a strong force as pickets still a mile farther to the left extending to the foot of Cedar Mountain (aka Slaughter Mountain). Just before noon, the 1st Maine drove back a small group of Rebel cavalry who reported back to Brig. Gen. Jubal Early, whose brigade was the vanguard of Ewell's division. Early brought up his guns and an artillery duel began between the opposing forces as Early's infantry formed a line on the same side of the Culpeper-Orange Turnpike as the 1st Maine in sight of the Cedar Run Ridge, but screened by trees from the regiment. Unbeknownst to them, the 1st Maine was "drawn up in line in front of the enemy's batteries, though unaware of this" As the rest of Ewell's division arrived, they formed on Early's right, anchored against the northern slope of the mountain. From there position the Rebels saw open and broken country with a corn field, and to the left of it an unharvested wheat field, extending to an opposing ridge covered with woods. Early pushed forward to the rise driving Bayard's pickets ahead of him, and when he crested the hill he saw the brigades of Bayard in front of him and on the following wooded ridge, Federal artillery. The artillery opened fore on him and drove him back under the protection of the hill. Early regrouped his line and deployed his batteries in advance of his right on the crest stretching to Cedar Mountain's north slope.

On the left of Bayard's line, the 1st Maine remained until 16:30 when these same rebel batteries shifted their fire from the Federal artillery and infantry and began shelling the regiment. Allen pulled his line of battle back 150 yards and they stopped. They soon saw Rebel cavalry and infantry descending the mountain and moving along with the evident intention of turning the Federal left. Allen placed a line of vedettes in that direction, and sent troopers into the woods to monitor the Rebel advance. Again, the batteries opened fire from the mountainside, and he shifted the line a little to avoid their shells but keeping the pickets and vedettes in place along the left flank.

====== The afternoon ======
In the afternoon, batteries of Bank's and Jackson engaged in a duel. During this exchange, the troopers of the 1st Maine who had remained with the regiment in Washington D.C. received their baptism of fire but lucked out with poor aim on behalf of Early's gunners followed by the higher priority of the Federal infantry and artillery on the ridge to their right. They would remain spectators to the main action of the battle. They were elevated on the ridge high enough to see the whole battle that would play out south and west of them.

Banks, still smarting from defeat by Jackson in the Valley, was anxious for revenge. Instead of fighting a defensive battle to buy time of the rest of the army's arrival, he decided to take the initiative and attack Jackson before he could fully form his lines despite being outnumbered 2 to 1. A little before 17:00 as the artillery fight began to wane, Banks attacked the Confederate right. Still expecting to face the same cautious opponent from the Valley, Jackson was taken by surprise by "another body of infantry, apparently debouching from one of those valleys hid from the view by the undulating character of the country" and very nearly driven from the field. The Federal advance was swift and threatened to break the Confederate line, prompting Early to come galloping to the front from Cedar Mountain where he was directing troop dispositions. Early's stabilizing presence and the raking fire of the Confederate guns halted the Union infantry's advance on the Confederate right. On the left, the Federals came from the woods directly into the flank of the 1st Virginia Infantry, who under the pressure from attack on two fronts broke for the rear. The Federals pushed on, not waiting to reform their lines, rolling through until they found themselves in the Rebels' rear. The Stonewall Brigade came up and was swept aside before it had a chance to react. Jackson had been hit hard, and his force was threatening to break.

At this point, Jackson rode to rally his men finding his old brigade coming up to reinforce the line. The Stonewall Brigade, inspired by their leader, attacked the Union troops, and drove them back. By this point, Banks' attack was spent and its initial success was unsupported. The Stonewall Brigade drove them back, but soon found themselves alone and unsupported. Banks's line reformed and counterattacked. Although driven back, the Stonewall Brigade's attack had bought enough time for Jackson to reform and send A.P Hill's arriving command into line. Jackson advanced and immediately overwhelmed Union right which collapsed. The Union left began to waver at the right flank's collapse and finally broke from Brig. Gen. Isaac R. Trimble's brigade's charge.

Throughout the late afternoon and early evening, the 1st Maine remained on the extreme left flank finding "that this passive service, this being merely interested spectators, this waiting in expectancy of being called into action, [a] much harder experience, and more trying than would have been active participation, no old soldier will question for a moment." Again, for seven of the companies, this was the first real battle that they had been in. The occasional artillery shells that came in their direction had ceased once the infantry divisions swept back and forth across the field.

====== Defeat ======
By 19:45, the Union line was in full retreat. In a last-ditch effort to help cover his infantry's retreat, Banks sent two squadrons from Buford's cavalry brigade at the Confederate line. They temporarily halted the Rebel advance but at great cost with only 71 of 174 escaping. The Confederate infantry and the 1st Maine's Shandoah Valley foe, the 7th Virginia Cavalry, now commanded by Col. William E. "Grumble" Jones' pursued the retreating Federals, nearly capturing Banks and Pope at their headquarters. (Note: The 7th was part of Jackson's cavalry, a brigade commanded by Brig. Gen. Beverly H. Robertson. It was an all Virginia portion of Stuart's Cavalry Corps, consisting of some of the 1st Maine's old foes from their time in the Shenandoah Valley, the 6th, 7th, and 12th regiments, the 17th Virginia Cavalry Battalion, a detachment from the 2nd, a detachment from the 4th, and Chew's Battery.)

As darkness fell, Jackson grew wary as he was unsure of the location of the rest of Pope's army and believing "it imprudent to continue to move forward during the darkness", halted the pursuit. The 1st Maine was still holding their line at 21:30, when some of Robertson's cavalry turned on the 1st Maine, firing and charging upon a portion of Company F (Capt. Boothby), wounding 2 men and killing 1 horse. Two squadrons reinforced Boothby and Company F. They drove the enemy back and held them in check until a rebel battery, that had moved from the mountain to the edge of the woods, opened fire on the reinforced squadron, luckily failing to inflict any damage. Col. Allen seeing how all the other Federal our forces had fallen back, and being without artillery or infantry support in easy range of Rebel infantry at the edge of the woods, pulled the regiment back to the cover of the woods a short distance in rear, and remained until the following morning, with pickets covering the flank. By around 2200, the fighting had ceased, and Jackson consolidated his command on the southern edge of the battlefield.

While the 1st Maine suffered relatively minor injuries, the battle was sharp and bloody: Union casualties of 2,353 (314 killed, 1,445 wounded, 594 missing), Confederate 1,338 (231 killed, 1,107 wounded). For two days, Jackson maintained his position south of Cedar Run on the western slope of the mountain, waiting for a Federal attack that did not come. The 1st Maine, as part of Bayard's command, patrolled on Jackson's flanks to keep Banks informed of the Rebels' positions and movement the day after the battle. On Monday, the regiment advanced south, but was stopped at the battlefield by a flag of truce and two companies were detailed to assist the ambulance men in recovering the dead and woumded from the field thereby seeing first-hand the "horrors of war". (Note: Of interest, Clara Barton conducted her first field work after the battle. While she cared for wounded soldiers in Washington, D.C., and on the battlefield after the First Bull Run, the Department of the Army only authorized her to visit the front lines on August 3, 1862. After her arrival on August 13, Barton spent two days and nights on the battlefield tending to the wounded, including Confederate prisoners.)

Finally, receiving news that all of Pope's army had arrived at Culpeper Court House, on August 12, Jackson fell back on Gordonsville to a more defensive position behind the Rapidan River. The battle effectively shifted fighting in Virginia from the Virginia Peninsula into northern Virginia. On that day, the 1st Maine, as part of Bayard's command, pushed forward and south again only to find Jackson had departed. They scouted all around the vicinity of the battlefield until Thursday, June 14, 1862 when they pushed further south to the Rapidan to patroll and picket the fords along the river. On Sunday the 17th, Bayard withdrew them back to the vicinity of the battlefield to stand down and recoup, rearm, and replenish mounts and equipment from 13–17 August.

===== Skirmishing at Brandy Station and the Rappahannock =====
Lest further setbacks with Jackson on the loose, wreaking havoc, Union General-in-Chief Henry Halleck halted Pope's advance on Gordonsville thereby surrendering initiative to Lee. Lee did not delay in acting.

On August 13, Lee sent Longstreet to reinforce Jackson, and on the following day Lee sent all of his remaining forces. Lee arrived at Gordonsville to take command on August 15. With Pope now on the defensive, Lee could unleash his forces more broadly upon Pope. He massed the Army of Northern Virginia south of Clark's Mountain and planned a turning movement to defeat Pope before McClellan's army could arrive to reinforce it. His plan was to send his cavalry under Stuart, followed by his entire army, north to the Rapidan River on August 18, screened from view by Clark's Mountain. Stuart would cross and destroy the railroad bridge at Somerville Ford and then move around Pope's left flank into the Federal rear, destroying supplies and blocking their possible avenues of retreat.

On Monday, the 18th, Pope began a retreat back to the northern side of the Rappahannock through Culpepper Court House. The 1st Maine, as part of Bayard's command, patrolled on Jackson's flanks to keep Banks informed of the Rebels' positions and movement. After Jackson withdrew south, the regiment was a tasked with screening the retreat and acting as part of the rear guard. Pope became aware of Lee's plan when one of his cavalry patrols captured a copy of the written order. Stuart was almost captured during this raid; his cloak and plumed hat did not escape. Throughout August 19–20, Pope was spread his army along the northern bank of the Rappahannock from Kelly's Ford northward to just above the railroad bridge at Rappahannock Station (present day Remington, Virginia) and prepared to defend the river crossings. On that day the head of Longstreet's right wing of Lee's army reached Kelly's Ford. On August 20–21, Pope withdrew to the line of the Rappahannock River. Lee had intended to cross the river above Pope's army to flank it but Pope was expanding northward too quickly. That combined with Rebel logistical difficulties and cavalry movement delays caused the plan to be abandoned.

====== August 20 ======
At first light, about six miles south of Brandy Station on the Raccoon Ford Roads (near present-day Stevensburg, VA), two Maine troopers foraging for chickens were captured by Rebel cavalry who were soon spotted by Capt. Taylor of Company G. He was there with two companies on the south side of the river screening the last of the wagons and infantry heading to Rappahannock Station. Although at the extreme limits of visual range for identificationm Taylor correctly guessed who they were when he saw a handkerchief waving at them from a local house. He sent riders back to alert the command and put his companies in line. Shortly after that, Taylor found himself having his pickets driven in by large numbers of Rebel cavalry.

Back at the Brandy Station, the command had been surprised by the news of the enemy's close proximity. Despite initial confusion and frenetic activity, Col. Allen had the men in line at Brandy Station athwart the Raccoon Ford Road just behind a rise that screened their presence from the advancing Rebels. When the head of the enemy column crested the rise, he dismounted his seventy-two men armed with carbines and pushing them forward in a skirmish line. The command remained calm and stationary as the Rebel column advanced and began firing. The regiment held their fire until the head of the column was at close range. On the order, the first volley staggered the Rebels and sent them back to the other side of the rise.

After regrouping, they came back as a brigade over the rise in battle lines. The range was close enough to where the regiment could use their pistols effectively as well as carbines. The regiment held the enemy brigade at bay as the 1st Rhode Island joined them. Eventually, Bayard and the rest of the brigade arrived and relieved them. (Note: Merrill and Tobie do not agree on the length of the action. Tobie astimates it lasted about 90 minutes. Merrill wrote that it lasted four hours.) Brig. Gen. Bayard sent Col. Allen and the 1st back to the crossing at Rappahannock Station to ensure the last of the retreating column got across the river. When he received word that the 1st Maine were in contact, Bayard had recalled all scouting parties. Soon, he sent the 1st Rhode Island after the 1st Maine to guard the crossing. The brigade continued to hold the Rebels through the afternoon until all his reconnaissance patrols had returned. At that point Bayard began a slow withdrawal to the crossing. The Confederates broke off contact in the late afternoon when a battalion charge by the 1st Pennsylvania drove them back.

At nightfall, the brigade relieved the 1st Maine and the 1st Rhode Island of their picket duties at the crossing. Col. Allen and his men crossed the river, set pickets, and bivouacked at the station. The last of Pope's wagon train crossed the river shortly after dark and joined its cohorts at the army's logistics park at Catlett's Station.

====== August 21–25 ======
On August 21 and 22 the northern ends of the two armies "waltzed", first Pope and then Longstreet expanding northward along the river. Each army kept its southern end anchored at Kelly's Ford. Lee then changed his strategy and ordered Jackson's left wing to move much further upriver in order to cross above Pope. By the morning 21 of August, Lee had changed his strategy and ordered Jackson's left wing to move much further upriver in order to cross above Pope.

The two armies fought a series of minor actions August 22–25 along the Rappahannock River, including Waterloo Bridge, Freeman's Ford, and Lee or Sulphur Springs, (Note: Located 7 miles (11 km) southwest of the center of Warrenton, Lee or Sulphur Springs was a well-known mineral water resort near on the Rappahannock River. A one-day stage coach ride from Washington, DC, the four story Pavilion, a grand hotel, was a popular with the slave-holding plantation elite. Among its guests were many national public figures including Presidents Monroe, Madison and Van Buren. Many of the wealthy plantation owners would spend extended stays with their families there. During Pope's campaign the hotel burned to the ground and remained in ruins through the war.) resulting in a few hundred casualties. Together, these skirmishes kept the attention of both armies along the river. Heavy rains had swollen the river and Lee was unable to force a crossing. Pope considered an attack across the river to strike Lee's right flank, but he was also stymied by the high water.

Smarting from the increasing audacity of the Federal cavalry whom he and his men held in disdain, Stuart retaliated crossing the Rappahannock at the northern end of Jackson's line. On August 23, Maj. Gen. J.E.B. Stuart's cavalry made a daring raid on Pope's headquarters at Catlett Station, thus showing that the Union right flank was vulnerable to a turning movement. The raid on Pope's headquarters at Catlett's Station arriving just before a thunderstorm, captured the Union commander's dress coat, demonstrating that Pope's right flank was vulnerable to a turning movement, although river flooding brought on by heavy rains would make this difficult. It also revealed to Lee the plans for reinforcing Pope's army, which would eventually bring it to the strength of 130,000 men, more than twice the size of the Army of Northern Virginia.

The 1st Maine's commissary sergeant, Martin T. V. Bowman, was at the station getting rations for the regiment. As the attack began, he, the brigade quartermaster, and another officer narrowly escaped capture by mounting up and darting into a nearby thicket. They rode for several miles, barely escaping the pursuit of Stuart;s troopers who continued to fire into the darkness after Bowman and his companions. Once the Rebels called off their chase, the three men regrouped and realized that they needed to know what was happening back at the station. Bowman volunteered and headed back. By now, the thunderstorm had begun. Torrents of rain and thunder helped mask his approach to the wagon park at the station. As he neared the station, he dismounted and moved on foot. When he reached the station, he saw Stuart's cavalry plundering what they could and burning what they could not carry. Surprised by a mounted Confedere behind him, Bowman literally dodged a bullet and plunged back into the thicket and the dark. Again, he was pursued by numerous riders, but he managed to find his horse, mount it, and make his escape. Returning to his comrades, he reported his observations. The Rebels seemed more determined to capture them this time and pursued them further forcing them across the Rappahannock. After a very close call, Stuart's men departed empty-handed. The three men made it back to the brigade by daylight. (Note: The identity of the third officer is unknown, but seeing he was also drawing rations from the brigade quartermaster, he would have been from one of the other regiments in the brigade: the 1st New Jersey, the 1st Pennsylvania, or the 1st Rhode Island.)

By this time, reinforcements from the Army of the Potomac were arriving from the Peninsula: Maj. Gen. Samuel P. Heintzelman's III Corps, Maj. Gen. Fitz-John Porter's V Corps, and elements of the VI Corps under Brig. Gen. George W. Taylor. Lee's new plan in the face of all these additional forces outnumbering him was to send Jackson and Stuart with half of the army on a flanking march to cut Pope's line of communication, the Orange & Alexandria Railroad. The Hotchkiss journal shows that Jackson, most likely, originally conceived the movement. In the journal entries for March 4 and 6 1863, General Stuart tells Hotchkiss that "Jackson was entitled to all the credit" for the movement and that Lee thought the proposed movement "very hazardous" and "reluctantly consented" to the movement. Pope would be forced to retreat and could be defeated while moving and vulnerable. Jackson departed on August 25 and reached Salem (present-day Marshall) that night.

===== Raiding Manassas Station =====
On Friday night, August 22, the regiment's commissary sergeant, M. T. V. Bowman, was at Catlett's Station, with the regiment's wagons, having just drawn rations and planning to return to the regiment Tuesday morning. He was talking with the brigade quartermaster in his tent talking, when Stuart's cavalry attacked the depot through a heavy downpour. Although a train managed to escape across Cedar Creek, the rebels made a second charge directly on the loaded wagons.

The fierce, thorough attack left no time to harness the teams, and Bowman, the quartermaster, and another officer barely had time to mount their horses. Although nearly surrounded, they escaped by riding a few hundred yards into thick woods. In the dark, they crashed through thick brush barely ahead of Confederate cavalrymen intent on their capture. Finding a road they did not recognize, they galloped away. Once the pursuit eased, they drew up in a small clearing to assess their situation. Bowman volunteered to return to assess the damage while the other two remained in the woods. Fortunately for the 1st Maine trooper, a severe thunderstorm screened his return and lightning flashes let him navigate. Seeing fires through the trees, he hitched his horse to a tree and continued on foot.

The rebels were busy plundering supplies, food, and alcohol, and burning the remainder. Behind him, a rebel challenged him and getting no countersign, fired and missed. Bowman managed to get back to his horse undetected. He made it through the woods, but once he hit the unknown road, a mounted group of Stuart's men a few hundred yards away saw him and fired. Managing to rejoin the officers just moments ahead of the rebels, the chase resumed. After crossing and recrossing a creek, they eluded Stuart's men again. At first light, Saturday, Bowman and his companions found they were about three miles northeast of the depot, five miles short of Bristoe Station.

Meanwhile, the regiment continued guarding the river fords. The 1st Maine and their brigade brethren spent the next few days constantly patrolling and picketing along the Rappahannock, occasionally trading shots with Rebels on the other bank. On the 26th, Bayard was sent to the right wing and attached to Maj. Gen. Fitz John Porter's command. They were then ordered to Thoroughfare Gap. The 1st Maine was sent with the brigade to Catlett Station on August 27, where it remained scouting and patrolling to the west and north looking for Jackson's forces.

===== Second Bull Run =====
Second Battle of Bull Run: actions on August 29 and 30

On the evening of August 26, after passing around Pope's right flank via Thoroughfare Gap before Porter got there, Jackson's wing of the army struck the Orange & Alexandria Railroad at Bristoe Station and before daybreak August 27 marched to capture and destroy the massive Union supply depot at Manassas Junction. This surprise movement forced Pope into an abrupt retreat from his defensive line along the Rappahannock. On August 27, Jackson routed the New Jersey Brigade of the VI Corps near Bull Run Bridge, mortally wounding its commander George W. Taylor. As he had done in the Shenandoah, Jackson used this opportunity to resupply his troops with captured supplies.

====== The battle ======
As a result of Jackson's maneuvering, Pope had lost contact with him and did not know where he was. As his columns were moving up to concentrate at Manassas Junction, one of Pope's dispatch riders was captured enroute from McDowell to Sigel and Reynolds. Jackson had put Ewell's and Taliaferro's Divisions in the cover of an unfinished railway cut at the foot of the southeast side of Stony Ridge. Resting his troops in the cut and in the shade of a grove of trees in the August heat, Jackson reacted quickly when he learned of Pope's plans.

Jackson mounted his horse and rode alone to the crest of the ridge that lay between the railway cut and Warrenton Turnpike. As he crested the ridge he could see King's 1st Division of McDowell's II Corps marching northeast on the Turnpike approaching its intersection with the Groveton-Sudley Road. The men in the column who saw him several hundred yards away did not recognize him and no unit reacted to his presence. Jackson went back and brought his troops to attack this column passing across his front in order to draw Pope's army into battle. The attack alerted Pope to his position. The fighting, also known as the Brawner's Farm fight, lasted several hours and resulted in a stalemate.

Convinced that he had trapped Jackson, the next morning, August 29, Pope launched a series of assaults against Jackson's position along the unfinished railroad grade. The attacks were repulsed with heavy casualties on both sides. At noon, Longstreet arrived on the field from Thoroughfare Gap and took position on Jackson's right flank. Overnight, Pope was reinforced by Heintzelman's III Corps and Porter's V Corps.

Seemingly unaware that Longstreet was on the field, Pope renewed his attacks on August 30. When massed Confederate artillery devastated Porter's V Corps attack on Jackson's right, Longstreet's wing of 28,000 men counterattacked in the largest simultaneous mass assault of the war. The Union left flank was crushed and the army driven back to Bull Run. Only an effective Union rearguard action prevented a replay of the First Bull Run disaster. Pope's retreat to Centreville was precipitous, nonetheless. The next day, Lee ordered his army to pursue the retreating Union army.

====== The regiment's role ======
The 1st Maine marched on the field at daylight on August 29 and formed in line of battle on the right of the army in the morning, and stayed there, under fire most of the time, but without being actively engaged. About noon one battalion, under command of Maj. Stowell, was sent to reconnoitre on the extreme right, and returned later in the day. As Companies G and K stood picket, the remainder of the regiment slept on the field keeping hold of the horses' bridles.

The regiment was early in line the next morning still on the extreme right flank between Matthews Hill and Bull Run. Despite a short Confederate barrage about 09:00, the trooper's day remained quiet until between 15:00-16:00, when a furious artillery duel began on the right. The 1st Maine was sent to scout the extreme right. After travelling a mile, some of Fitzhugh Lee's batteries opened on it, but no serious damage was done. After completing the mission, they returned to their original position and found Thomas's Division of A.P. Hill's Corps occupying it. Filing around and through the woods North of Matthews Hill, the 1st Maine came into the open field and found Gen. Pope's force beginning to give way.

As a growing retreat followed, they were posted across the Warrenton Turnpike between Henry And Matthews Hills and received the order, "draw sabre", to stop troops from leaving the field; despite their great efforts, the regiment were overwhelmed by the numbers. (Note: "It should be understood that at this time the army was by no means demoralized. There were stragglers, and many of them, but the great bulk of the army was in good order and still fighting nobly.") After a while, Col. Allen and his command withdrew half a mile to the northeast side of Young's Branch forming up to again try to keep order and rally the retreating soldiers. When the troopers soon found that the Rebel artillery had their range, Col. Allen pulled the regiment back further, this time crossing Bull Run stream, where the line was again formed at dusk. Finally the regiment moved back to Centreville about midnight, and camped for the night, being in the screen between the enemy and Pope's army.

The regiment was not actively engaged in the battle, though under fire a great portion of the· time. Its loss was therefore slight with one or two men taken prisoner, who were serving as orderlies and captured while carrying dispatches.

The day after the battle, Sunday, August 31, was relatively quiet. The regiment scouted toward Cub Run, and after a bit of a scrap with the enemy, returned and picketed Warrenton Turnpike a just before Germantown a couple of miles east of Centreville. Forseveral days the regiment skirmished and scouted along the boundary between the armies.

===== Chantilly =====
After the Second Bull Run, the ANV, remained extremely quiet, but Lee sent Jackson on a wide flanking march, hoping to cut off the Pope's retreat. On September 1, beyond Chantilly Plantation on the Little River Turnpike near Ox Hill, Jackson was stopped by two U.S. divisions under Maj. Gens. Philip Kearny and Isaac Stevens who both lost their lives in the acion. The 1st Maine remained on picket south of the action at Chantilly until early evening when it was ordered back to Fairfax Court House to join Reno's·2nd Division of Burnside's IX Corps. Recognizing that his army was still in danger at Fairfax Courthouse, Pope ordered the retreat to continue to Washington.

On Tuesday, September 2, the 1st Maine moved toward Alexandria, three or four miles, and stood provost duty, stopping stragglers until 15:00, when the retreat to Washington resumed. The troopers camped in a peach orchard, three miles out of Alexandria. From there they scouted up and back on the south side of the Potomac. During this campaign, barely a month long, the men had seen hard, continuous service, and on their arrival at Alexandria were well worn out and somewhat discouraged at the lack of satisfactory results from all their hardships, fighting, sufferings and loss of life. Without tents since the August 6, they had lived mostly on green corn cooked when time allowed, having very little hard tack or other issued rations of any sort. The heat, dust, hunger, and thirst wore on them and the saddles had not been off their horses for more than two hours over the last fifteen days. At night, formed in line of battle, they had dismounted and lain down in front of their horses, with the bridle thrown over the arm, or the halter attached to some part of the body. Morale also took a further hit when the regimental band's mustered out service as a needless and costly luxury, and went home, much to the sorrow of the members of the regiment. Men and horses were well worn out, but amidst all their tribulations, they kept faith in the eventual triumph of their cause.

==== Maryland Campaign ====
Maryland Campaign, actions September 3–20, 1862 Confederate Union

The campaign of Pope, northern Virginia campaign, was over, and Lincoln placed McClellan in command of all U.S. Army forces near Washington on Tuesday, September 2. The 1st Maine would find itself quite busy over the course of the ensuing Maryland campaign.

Following his victory over Pope, Lee invaded the north with 55,000 men through the Shenandoah Valley starting on September 4, 1862. His objectives were to resupply his army outside of the war-torn Virginia theater thereby damaging Northern morale in the 1862 mid-term elections, and to inspire the citizens of Maryland to rise up and secede from the United States. As such, Tobie would later write:

Finally, it appeared· that Lee, instead of striking at Washington, as was the chronic fear during the most of the war, was making his way into Maryland, with the intention of releasing the thousands in that state whom he had been led to believe were friends of southern independence, from the bondage of the United States government, and in the hope of adding large numbers to his force; then, doubtless, of giving the state of Pennsylvania a taste of the horrors of war in part retaliation for what his own state of Virginia had suffered, if not, with his army largely increased by the disloyalists of "My Maryland," of making an attack on Washington from that direction. His ill success in awakening any enthusiasm among the people of Maryland by his stirring addresses and kind offers to "aid them in throwing off the foreign yoke, to enable them to again enjoy the inestimable right of freemen, to restore the independence and sovereignty of their state, and to regain the rights of which they bad been so unjustly despoiled", and his disappointment thereat, are matters of familiar history as are also his defeats at South Mountain and Antietam, and his subsequent retreat back into Virginia.

Lee split the ANV so he could continue north into Maryland while Jackson simultaneously captured Harpers Ferry. Meanwhile, U.S. forces accidentally found a copy of Lee's orders to his subordinate commanders, and McClellan planned to use it to isolate and defeat the separated portions of the ANV.

The regiment was near Alexandria Wednesday morning, September 3, resting a bit. About noon, the 3rd Battalion (Companies E, G, K, and I), Capt. Taylor's command, scouted toward Fairfax. Reaching within two or three miles of the courthouse, they made contact with Rebel pickets and after one or two slight skirmishes with no serious results, they pulled back a couple of miles and went on picket, remaining there that night, and rejoining the regiment on Thursday.

Word having been received that the Union wounded left on the field of Bull Run had been uncared for, on Wednesday, Company F went out after the 3rd Battalion's departure, as guard for an ambulance train sent to recover such as were still alive to where they would receive proper treatment. The troopers were horrified at the wounded men's condition, others in the regiment, when told by the returning company, counted themselves fortunate not to witness it.

By Friday, September 5, the AoP learned Lee had moved west into the 1st Battalion's familiar Shenandoah heading north. The regiment recrossed the Potomac and went into camp that night on Seventh Street in Washington where it hoped for a much-needed rest for men and horses. Upon arrival, it was attached to Reno's 2nd Division of Burnside's IX Corps. McClellan had organized his army into three wings of which Maj. Gen. Burnside's right wing contained Maj. Gen. Joseph Hooker's I Corps and Reno's IX Corps. As a result on Thursday, September 4, the regiment crossed the Potomac and joined IX Corps as it left Washington. Unbeknownst the 1st Maine, Lee had crossed the Potomac into Maryland and occupied Frederick, situated 12 miles from the river, and 43 miles northwest of the capital on Saturday. As a result, after just one day in camp, the men were again on the march on Sunday, September 7, and by nightfall the troopers had reached Leesboro after an insufferably hot, dusty march where at times the dust, which choked men and horses, was sometimes so dense that was it impossible to see ten feet away. The regiment was assigned to 2nd division, and Company G, under Cpt Zebulon B. Blethen, was detailed as Reno's bodyguard when he was elevated to IX Corps command just before starting on this march. A day or two later, A and I were detailed as bodyguard for Brig. Gen. Rodman, whose 3rd Division was leading the IX Corps' advance. At the same time, Companies M and H were assigned as Fitz John Porter's V Corps headquarters' bodyguard.

===== Frederick and South Mountain =====
Over the next week, the rest of the 1st Maine was busy scouting different directions, an experience which differed greatly from their campaigns in hostile territory. Troopers remembered these forays for the kind looks, smiling faces, and loyal words they encountered while out. They later recalled the relief they felt as they sought information from citizens concerning the enemy's movements because, for once, they were not being misinformed.

The 1st Maine, alongside the 6th Pennsylvania (known as "Rush's Lancers," facetiously dubbed by the 1st Maine troopers as the "turkeystickers"), and the 6th New York scouted the country between Maj. Gen. Sumner's II Corps (Note: This corps contained three divisions, and its veteran elements had a good fighting reputation.) and the right wing, passing through Hyattsville, MD, during its movement on Antietam. As the regiment was in Reno's IX Corps. Company G's whereabouts and wanderings were nearly the same as those of the regiment. During the move, Burnside began tasking his cavalry assets directly while still leaving them administratively part of IX Corps. The wing moved north to the Baltimore & Ohio Railroad (B&ORR). Hitting the railway, Burnside's wing turned west and followed the macadamized National Pike, which paralleled the rail line, toward Frederick, MD. As they moved west, Allen and his peers dutifully reported contact with Confederate elements as well as intelligence from local Unionist citizens. On the Wednesday morning, September 10, the 6th New York made contact with rebel pickets east of Frederick and a loyal citizen told them parts of Jackson's corps were preparing to leave.

Two days later, on Friday, September 12, the AoP's cavalry was at the outskirts of Frederick where Lee's rearguard of Maj. Gen. D. H. Hill's division of Maj. Gen. MG Jackson's wing had not yet gone. By this time, only half of the 1st Maine Cavalry, six companies, were not on detached service, and they advanced on the city under the 6th New York's Col. Devlin's lead. (Note: A New York City native, son of Irish immigrant parents, Devin was a house painter and partner in a paint and varnish company with his brother John for much of his early life, while also serving in the New York State Militia. Devin himself only had eight of his twelve companies as four had been detached as headquarter bodyguards. For more information, see his Wikipedia article here.). The scratched together brigade, followed closely by the Kanawha Division (Note: This division had only arrived in the eastern theater a few weeks before hand having spent its initial 18 months of service in the rugged mountains of the future West Virginia. The division had spent most of its time in counter-insurgency operations and keeping the salt mines up there out of reach of Confederate logisticians. For more information, see its Wikipedia article.) met Rebel cavalry under Hampton at the Monocacy River bridge for the National Pike 3 miles (4.8 km) east of Frederick, about two o'clock in the afternoon. After a severe skirmish occurred, in which the enemy was driven back into the town, Cox commanding the Kanawha, deployed his division in line of battle once across the river on both sides of the National Pike. Once deployed, the 6th New York and 1st Maine moved forward with a full division of infantry alongside them advanced west. Although the Rebels attempted to make a stand in the streets of Frederick, D. H. Hill's troops were forced to give way, and fled west out of the city and up over the Catoctin Hills leaving a cavalry screen that prevented the AoP's scouts from tracking Hill's division.

The regiment's loss was slight, but the fighting was close, and several sabre cuts were given and received. The AoP soon held the city after a one-week Rebel occupation that failed to attract the hordes of new recruits to the ANV that Lee and his men had expected. In contrast, the 1st Maine and others in IX Corps soon found that Frederick was a stronghold of unionists, and as Hampton's cavalry (Hill's rearguard) departed, "while the carbine smoke and the smell of powder still lingered", the local citizens warmly received them giving the column fruits and refreshments. The future president Rutherford B. Hayes, then commanding the 23rd Ohio Volunteer Infantry within the Kanawah, wrote to his wife of the joy of the residents at their arrival after four days of occupation by the Confederates, and a local resident later wrote, "a regiment of Ohio volunteers makes its appearance and is hailed with most enthusiastic demonstrations of joy. Handkerchiefs are waved, flags are thrown from Union houses, and a new life appears infused into the people." The Kanawha did not get to tarry in Frederick, as McClellan continued to push his people forward, and the infantry encamped Friday night just beyond the western edge of the town at the foot of the Catocton Heights.

Meanwhile the 1st Maine was made the provost guard for Frederick with Burnside appointing Col Allen the city's military governor, and Company D's Capt. Smith, the provost marshal. Burnside also appointed Adjt. Stevens as Allen's acting assistant adjutant general, and Company F's Capt. Boothby, as his aid de-camps.

While the main body of the 1st Maine restored order in Frederick, the next day, September 13, Saturday, the other cavalry units cleared the passage over the Catoctin Hills, and Burnside's Right Wing, consisting of Hooker's I and Reno's IX Corps, moved west and throughout Saturday occupied the vicinity of Middletown. Not remaining in Frederick with the regiment, Company G, keeping with the general, also moved to Middletown on Saturday. Pleasonton's cavalry pushed further along the National Pike before meeting Rebel cavalry pickets at the foot of South Mountain as the road ascended to Turner's Gap, a depression in South Mountain's crest. Old Sharpsburg Road left the turnpike a little west of Middletown to the left, and crossed at Fox's Gap, about 1 mile (1.6 km) south of Turner's. These gaps and the adjoining mountain crests were 1,000 feet (300 m) above Middletown were wooded, save a few small farms, meadows, and cultivated fields gave the Rebels a clear view of any Federal advance before they could pass through and strike Lee's unconcentrated army. Escorted by Company G, Reno met with Cox and told him to send one of his brigades to support a cavalry reconnaissance by Pleasonton at Turner's Gap in the morning.

On the sabbath day, the troopers in Company G saw the Rebels occupying the advantageous positions in the gaps on South Mountain, blocking the National Pike and Old Sharpsburg Road. In the ensuing Battle of South Mountain, Burnside's two corps defeated Rebels under Longstreet and Hill at Turner's and Fox's Gaps respectively. The men in the company later told their brethren that they had "a fine view of the battle from afar off" acting efficiently as orderlies when required. Reno and IX Corps attacked Fox's Gap. With the Kanawha leading the way, it was a hard fight. Around 4:00 p.m., there was a slight wavering of the IX Corps lines, and Company G was detached from HQ escort and sent out to stop stragglers, which duty it performed till dark. In the meantime, around 5:00 p.m., Gen. Reno passed to the front and took command of IX Corps in person until the enemy was completely routed. At this point, roughly 7:50 p.m., dusk was approaching, and in the fading light, the general got too far forward and was mortally wounded and taken to the rear where he died ten minutes later at 8:00. Command of IX Corps fell to Cox, and Company G escorted the general's body back to Middletown that night, and the next day was detailed as orderlies and guard at Burnside's headquarters' train.

As a result of Burnside's success, the ANV drew off of South Mountain to Sharpsburg. If McClellan had moved quickly, he might have caught Lee's army before it could concentrate. (Note: The AoP's casualties were 2,325 (443 killed, 1,807 wounded, and 75 missing) of 28,000 engaged (roughly 8%); The ANV lost 2,685 (325 killed, 1560 wounded, and 800 missing) of 18,000 (roughly 15%).) The AoP was buoyed by the victory where they ended "the tide of Rebel successes," Lee considered ending his invasion. However, McClellan's limited activity on Monday, September 15, doomed the U.S. garrison at Harpers Ferry, and gave Lee time to unite the rest of his army at Sharpsburg before the upcoming battle on Wednesday. During this time, the main body of the regiment was diligently applying itself to restoring order in Frederick. Meanwhile, on Monday and Tuesday, September 15–16, Company G remained on the other side of the Catoctin heights near Middletown providing security for Burnside's Headquarters' train.

===== Battle of Antietam =====
The next day, Wednesday, September 17, the AoP defeated Lee in the costly Battle of Antietam, only Companies M and H participated as headquarters escort for Porter's V Corps. Despite the heavy combat, V Corps was held in reserve and did not engage. On that day also, G Company guarding Burnside's train moved through Boonesborough to near Antietam, where they went into camp at dusk, knowing nothing of the great battle which was fought and the great Union victory which was won that day, unless by reports and the sounds of the cannon and musketry and from that one or two of the troopers who went up to see the fight, one of whom had a horse shot under him while there. Companies M and H spent the battle escorting Porter and carrying messages from him to his superiors, peers, and subordinates. On Thursday, September 18, the two armies stared at each other across the lines while improvising a truce to recover and exchange their wounded, and that evening, Lee's ANV began withdrawing across the Potomac into Virginia.

The Maine troopers were lucky in that the cost of the victory was horrendous. The United States had 12,410 casualties with 2,108 dead, and the Confederacy lost 10,316 with 2,847 dead. This represented 25% of the Federal force and 31% of the Confederates. Overall, both sides lost a combined total of 22,727 casualties in a single day, almost the same amount as the number of losses that had shocked the nation at the 2-day Battle of Shiloh five months earlier These were the most casualties for a single-day battle during the war, and has been described as the bloodiest day in all of American history.

===== Frederick =====
Frederick soon became the site for the bulk of the AoP's wounded and the captured Rebel prisoners-of-war (POWs). It was soon full of sick and wounded soldiers, and all the churches and all the other public buildings being used as hospitals. The regiment would remain at Frederick, from September 12 to November 2, up to which period it had lost in action and worn out in service nearly 700 horses.

The AoP remained in and near Sharpsburg and did not cross the Potomac in pursuit of the enemy. They recovered from the battle, constantly trained newer recruits that survived their initial battle, and resupplied the army. Lincoln was disappointed in McClellan's performance. He believed that the general's cautious and poorly coordinated actions in the field had forced the battle to a draw rather than a crippling Confederate defeat. He was even more astonished that from September 17 to October 26, despite repeated entreaties from the War Department and the president, McClellan declined to pursue Lee across the Potomac, citing shortages of equipment and the fear of overextending his forces. Many in the AoP, in agreement with their commander on the war and politics, had been leery of attacking on September 18 and had been expecting Lee to strike back. The AoP's failure to vigorously pursue Lee elicited little dissent within it. Many in the army complained about the pressure placed on them by the public, press, and president. On September 22, 1862, Lincoln used the victory to issue the preliminary Emancipation Proclamation, which elicited strong political overtones within the AoP. Lincoln and the Republicans needed the support of the war Democrats like McClellan and other generals in the AoP, but were extremely frustrated by the AoP's lack of aggression. Henry W. Halleck wrote in his official report, "The long inactivity of so large an army in the face of a defeated foe, and during the most favorable season for rapid movements and a vigorous campaign, was a matter of great disappointment and regret."

Until September 29, Company G continued guard duty for Burnside's train, when a move was made half about 12 miles (19 km) or so towards Harper's Ferry, and camp was pitched near the Potomac. Here they remained until Monday, October 6, when the train moved downriver about 6 miles (9.7 km)and, on the next day, went into camp at Knoxville where they would remain there for three weeks until Monday, October 27.

Meanwhile, Lee had withdrawn his damaged army across the Potomac, back into Virginia through the Shenandoah Valley and started rebuilding and refitting the ANV. Situated in and around Winchester and the Valley Turnpike in the Shenandoah, Lee was still expecting the U. S. forces to advance at any moment. To spoil this, he, on Thursday, October 10, three weeks after the battle, sent Stuart and his cavalry out from the lower Shenandoah to ride around the Federal army for the second time in the war in his Chambersburg Raid.

Lee had withdrawn his damaged army across the Potomac, back into Virginia through the Shenandoah Valley and started rebuilding and refitting the ANV. The AoP remained in and near Sharpsburg recovering from the contest as well. Lincoln was disappointed in McClellan's performance. He believed that the general's cautious and poorly coordinated actions in the field had forced the battle to a draw rather than a crippling Confederate defeat. He was even more astonished that from September 17 to October 26, despite repeated entreaties from the War Department and the president, McClellan declined to pursue Lee across the Potomac, citing shortages of equipment and the fear of overextending his forces. Many in the AoP, in agreement with their commander on the war and politics, had been leery of attacking on September 18 and had been expecting Lee to strike back. The AoP's failure to vigorously pursue Lee elicited little dissent within it. Many in the army complained about the pressure placed on them by the public, press, and president. On September 22, 1862, Lincoln used the victory to issue the preliminary Emancipation Proclamation, which elicited strong political overtones within the AoP. Lincoln and the Republicans needed the support of the war Democrats like McClellan and other generals in the AoP, but were extremely frustrated by the AoP's lack of aggression. Henry W. Halleck wrote in his official report, "The long inactivity of so large an army in the face of a defeated foe, and during the most favorable season for rapid movements and a vigorous campaign, was a matter of great disappointment and regret."

Meanwhile in and around Winchester and the Valley Turnpike in the Shenandoah, Lee was expecting the U. S. forces to advance at any moment. To spoil this, he, on Thursday, October 10, three weeks after the battle, sent Stuart and his cavalry out from the lower Shenandoah to ride around the Federal army for the second time in the war in his Chambersburg Raid. Avoiding Federal troops, Stuart arrived in Chamberburg at 7:00 p.m. that night. To continue avoiding large bodies of troops, Stuart planned a different return route to the east by way of Cashtown, Pennsylvania and into Maryland through Emmitsburg, Maryland on their way back to Virginia. The rain from the previous day left the ground wet and the 5-mile (8-kilometer) long column raised no dust from which they might be detected. They captured a Union courier about 6 miles (9.7 km) south of Emmitsburg with information which disclosed some of the Union cavalry movements, allowing Stuart to change his route again to avoid the 1st Maine and other regiments at Frederick, but also assuring him that his location was not definitely known. Confederate troopers who had lived in the area guided Stuart on back roads to avoid Union scouts and to avoid any troops that might be waiting for his return along his original, more hilly, route.

The regiment's duties in Frederick were patrolling the town night and day, scouting and reconnoitering, and doing provost duty generally. Some 500 rebel POWs were held in the city jail, and on Wednesday night, October 15, secessionist partisans, possibly emboldened by Stuart's recent presence, tried to facilitate their escape by setting fire to the jail. The plan did not work; and the alarm was sounded. In less than ten minutes, despite all off-duty troopers being unsaddled and asleep, the regiment was mounted and had the jail surrounded. Although many desperate Rebel attempts were made, not a POW escaped. The 5th New York Infantry Regiment, which like many of the New York City regiments contained members of the New York Fire Brigade, was then in the town, used their expertise and experience to soon have the fire under control.

The 1st Maine's posting in Frederick, although not extremely hard, was important, protecting the wounded, the logistical soldiers, and local citizens. The guarding, patrolling, scouting, and picketing around the city were constant. Frequent intelligence from frightened citizens from the surrounding country of projected raids by Rebel cavalry or partisans to free POWs, to attack U.S. forces, or to murder loyal citizens, of which it would not do to take no action. In response, the 1st Maine frequently turned out at a moment's notice to repel an attack, which had either existed only in the imagination of alarmed farmers, or which had been thwarted by the raising of the alarm.

The Maine troopers also had to contend with the aforementioned POWs to guard, the secret and open secessionists living in the town to be monitored and arrested if necessary, the security of the scores of hospitals after South Mountain and Antietam, together with any amount of orderly and safeguard duty to be performed. In short, it was a time of constant, wearying watchfulness and care, and of continual service. Still, the 1st Maine troopers felt that they were among friends, and rather enjoyed serving in and about the pleasant city of Frederick. Further, the regiment was reinforced by a draft of 250 recruits from Maine who were quickly assigned to different companies to take the places of those who had died or been discharged from the service.

The 1st Maine executed their duties with general acceptance to all except the Rebels, and even these were forced to acknowledge the fairness of their treatment. A frequent annoyance to Col. Allen were the persistent efforts of Maryland secessionists to aid their friends confined there in prison. The almost daily delivery of aid parcels was accompanied by constant demands from secessionist women for permission to visit or take these parcels into the jail. Allen denied these requests with the exception of food and clothing (not gray) and small quantities of money.

Capt. Smith, as provost marshal, found his duties confusing and difficult requiring an intuition and administrative ability. Unable to find a provost marshal's terms of reference within the Army Regulations, Smith gradually came to realize that he had almost unlimited power to impose law and order in the city as executive officer of the military governor. First, he had to facilitate the AoP's traffic through the city. He also had to police the city under martial law keeping control of the saloons, brothels, and establishments of all kinds. The city, as mentioned before, was home to discordant secessionists, some imprisoned for actions supporting the Rebels, and Confederate POWs greatly increasing the workload for Allen and Smith.

While Rebel raids never entered Frederick proper, raids did occur in its outskirts. Large numbers of Rebel cavalry raided Poolesville, 19 miles (31 km) south of the city, taking telegraph operators there prisoner before paroling them. Smaller groups raided as close as Urbana, the town adjoining Frederick, 8 miles (13 km) southeast occasionally murdering individuals to sow terror in the populace. (Note: Per Tobie, in Urbana, four raiders "called at the house of the postmaster, a strong Union man, called him into his store and made prisoner of him and his clerk, a fine young fellow. Then they commenced plundering, and the postmaster managed to slip them. The leader of the gang got mad and ordered his men to shoot the clerk, as he should not get away; but the men refused, when he took a pistol and shot him himself. The ball entered the poor fellow's lungs and he must die If he is not already dead. Can you find a word expressive enough to use in speaking of that act? I can't, without being profane. The gang left, and got safely across the river, the citizens of the town not caring to interfere. The postmaster remained all night scouting round, not daring to go home, having no arms, and came here yesterday morning.")

When the AoP and ANV passed through Frederick and its suburbs, their passage was the source of economic ruin for many local farmers. The armies burned and destroyed a large amount of fencing as well as crops. After they were gone, Allen appointed a board of appraisal to survey all such damages for the owners' recompense. The board investigated deeply, and, due to the reimbursement coming from the U. S. Federal government, compelled each claimant to take the oath of allegiance before they would investigate his claim. This caused some local secessionists to lose out on government assistance.

During their stay there many of the troopers participated in the local Methodist revival meetings. This served facilitate a Calvinist/Methodist exchange of worship which gave life to the meetings. Troopers would later remember the nightly meetings and the religious excitement as white and black congregants "...would be affected with a strange power, and there would be singing, and praying, and shouting, almost to the verge of hysterics, and wild excitement everywhere. Strong men would be stricken down in an instant, and prostrated on the floor." Although many of the troopers went only to satisfy their curiosity, and raised an eyebrow at this behavior, their "down-east training and reverence for sacred things" prevented them from any unmanly conduct.

So passed the summer and fall of 1862, and all along through those campaigns, ... the cavalryman grew more and more disgusted and was inclined to be ashamed that he belonged to a branch of the service that had cost the government so much to put into the field and maintain, and that was of so little real benefit; and he hung his head at the remark so often heard, "Who ever saw a dead cavalryman?" He could see in his services as a whole, no good gained, though he had performed every duty assigned him, and performed it well; had obeyed all orders faithfully (and who could do more?). His duties had been arduous and continuous. He had worked much harder than the infantryman or artilleryman, had suffered equally, had marched three or four times as much, bad slept less and been on duty more, had really fought as much, yet there seemed to be nothing to show for it as compared to the glorious deeds of his brothers-in-arms who were on foot. But he had been gaining all the time in experience of the best sort, had become an old campaigner, and was now perfectly at home on his horse. This, of course, he could not then fully understand.

— Edward Parsons Tobie, Service of the cavalry in the Army of the Potomac

==== From the Upper Rappahannock to the Fredericksburg campaign ====
In October, the regiment had reunited and administratively attached to Rush's 3rd Brigade of Pleasonton's Cavalry Division of Maj. Gen. Williams' XII Corps alongside the 4th Pennsylvania and 6th Pennsylvania (due to their early use of 9-foot lances, also known as "Rush's Lancers"), with whom they patrolled northwest Maryland and south central Pennsylvania skirmishing with Stuart's cavalry.

===== The AoP moves south =====
On Sunday, November 2, the 1st Maine Cavalry was relieved from provost duty at Frederick and ordered to report to John F. Reynolds at Rectortown, 41 miles (66 km) southsouthwest across the Potomac in Virginia, to join McClellan's slow pursuit of the ANV. Col. Allen and the staff officers of the military governor were left on duty in that city, where they remained until the following January, when Col. Allen and Adjt. Stevens resigned, on account of ill health, and went home, and Captains Smith and Boothby rejoined the regiment. Under Lt. Col. Douty's command, the regiment broke camp, marched southwest through Jefferson, halted for the night .5 miles (0.80 km) short of the Potomac.

The next morning, they reached the little village of Berlin on the riverbank where eight huge piers, at equal distances, stretching across the river, with heavy abutments on each bank, were all that remained of an old bridge. In an incredibly short time, however, a pontoon bridge began taking its place. The simple structure was novel to many in the regiment. Consisting of boats about 10 feet (3.0 m) apart, stringers across them, and covered plank, the bridge was short work. The pontoon bridge novices were anxious as the boats swayed back and forth with the current or rose and sank under the tread of the horses and men, who both "reeled as if drunk." Carefully leading their horses along the frail roadway, with some personnel leery that the bridge would sink at any moment, all men crossed safely, which restored their faith in pontoon bridges. Seven months before, the 1st Maine had crossed Long Bridge at Washington, only to be driven back into Maryland after five months of marching, countermarching, and fighting.

The regiment, once again attached to Bayard's brigade, marched south with I Corps along a macadam road through gently rolling, well-watered country. At a distance on the left, the Potomac rolled south and east, while off on the right, dense forests covering the Blue Ridge were already dressed in autumn colors. After 6 miles (9.7 km), the regiment went into bivouac in the Rebel's territory, and soon many heard certain discordant sounds suggestive of confiscated poultry. Tuesday, November 4, the march passed through Willow Mount and Philomont to Unison, 5 miles (8.0 km) east of Snicker's Gap, where it camped that night. The next day the southwesterly march continued, halting for a time at Upperville where the men saw McClellan and his staff pass by, and slept that night in the woods to its south.

On November 6, the regiment marched to Salem, (present day Marshall, Virginia) and there led the AoP southeast toward Warrenton. Company F was advance guard, and, when within 3 miles (4.8 km) of Warrenton, they caught up with the ANV's rear guard, attacked, drove them through Warrenton, and then fell back under cover of artillery. A small patrol gave chase to the Rebels while the rest waited for the main body to come up. While waiting, the company saw a mounted man a little ahead of them, to whom a small group gave chase, but being well-mounted, he soon evaded them. In escaping, however, he ran directly into the returning patrol who were setting up a vedette, and he was captured. Dismounted and put under guard of two men, he was sent back to the company. As the trio were on their way, they saw two more armed enemy horsemen approaching them. Instantly putting their prisoner up front, the two troopers quickly captured these two, thus reporting to Company F with three prisoners and horses quickly identified as from the 3rd Virginia Cavalry.

The regiment soon joined Company F and secure the town. In the evening, Bayard arrived with his command and stood the 1st Maine down to bivouac. Once again in Warrenton, the troopers noted they were always marching back and forth to this town continually. Upon relief, the regiment moved south of town and encamped on the road leading to the spa at White Sulphur Springs. Since the weather had become cold and the snow was beginning to fall, the troopers pitched their tents for the first time since leaving Frederick and, next morning, went on picket at the springs and along the Rappahannock, remaining there until the following Tuesday, November 11, picketing, patrolling, scouting and foraging. By this time in the war, the Maine cavalrymen had become used to taking anything they wished to without conscience, had gained an ability to find hidden things that exceeded the ability of those hiding them, and had raised foraging to a fine art.

===== Burnside takes over =====
After McClellan failed to pursue Lee's retreat from Antietam, from Lincoln fired McClellan on Wednesday, November 5, 1862, and replaced him with Burnside on Friday. Immediately receiving pressure from Lincoln and general-in-chief Halleck, Burnside planned a late fall offensive that the relied on quick movement and deception. Concentrating his army in a visible fashion near Warrenton, feigning a movement on Culpeper Court House, Orange Court House or Gordonsville, he would then shift rapidly southeast and cross the Rappahannock to Fredericksburg, hoping to steal a march on Lee and leaving Richmond vulnerable via the Richmond, Fredericksburg and Potomac Railroad (RF&P). This move also removed the threat of a flanking attack from Jackson from the Shenandoah if he attacked south from Warrenton.

While Burnside began assembling a supply base at Falmouth, Washington reviewed the plan. Lincoln, correctly, saw the main goal was the destruction of Lee and his army and not Richmond, but despite this when Burnside presented his plan on Thursday, November 14, Lincoln reluctantly approved it. Halleck wired Burnside, "The President has just assented to your plan," adding for emphasis: "He thinks that it will succeed if you move rapidly; otherwise not."

Burnside saw the rapid movement of his army as key to catching Lee, off guard, and that the river crossing could be made before Lee could concentrate his forces at Fredericksburg and contest the crossing. The 1st Maine was familiar with the Rappahannock upriver from Warrenton and for a few miles below it. They were less familiar with the lower part of the river around the mill town, Fredericksburg, where it deepens and can only be crossed by bridges. Opposite the northern end of Fredericksburg was a smaller town mill town, Falmouth. Bridges between the towns had been destroyed during Johnston's withdrawal a year before. Any crossing would need to be done at a ford or with pontoon bridges.

Burnside went into action immediately. On Tuesday, November 11, the 1st Maine broke camp, and marched to Rappahannock Station where it remained, performing the usual variety of duty, until the next Monday, November 17. The Confederate pickets were across the river on higher clear ground and could be easily seen by the troopers who themselves were comparatively out of observation in the woods along the river. The men of the regiment exploited this by foraging across the river for fodder narrowly escaping capture by Confederate soldiers alerted to their presence by the owners of the fodder.

On Friday, November 15, he began to pull his army out of the Warrenton, Virginia area and head southeast towards Fredericksburg. That morning, IX Corps, including the 1st Maine, made a demonstration against the Confederates across the river on the higher ground at the mineral springs while I Corps made feints at Freeman's and Beverly's fords further east. Cavalry and infantry captured the bridge at Rappahannock Station intact. Two days later, the brigade and regiment again broke camp. The 1st Maine marched to Freeman's Ford on the Rappahannock where it rejoined Bayard's brigade (which was now the cavalry brigade of Smith's VI Corps) and manned the picket line in the rain.

===== The Battle of Fredericksburg =====
Before beginning his campaign, Burnside had arranged for the shipment of the pontoon wagon trains through the Union Army's General in Chief, Henry Halleck. (Note: Burnside first ordered them a week before Lincoln's approval (along with many other provisions) on November 7.) Burnside had planned for the pontoons to arrive the same time as his first elements on Sunday evening, November 17. When Halleck had visited Burnside, it was agreed that they were to be rapidly transported south, to be used in crossing the Rappahannock. Halleck returned to Washington and resumed the duties of his office, evidently not understanding that he was to charge himself with this special duty, therefore neither Halleck nor Quartermaster General Montgomery Meigs, who was responsible for supplying necessary equipment and supplies for the pontoon trains, acted with the urgency needed. Just before he cut his communications with Washington on Sunday, November 17, to make his move, he had tasked his Chief Engineer Cyrus B. Comstock to check the status of the pontoons' movement. Receiving no answer before beginning his march, it would be two days before he found out where they were. In fact, when the first elements of the AoP had arrived opposite Fredericksburg, they were still at Washington, Burnside supposing that Halleck would forward them without delay. Due to the miscommunication between Burnside and Washington in the planning stages, Comstock's queries caused confusion followed by sudden urgency. The Confederate scouts were still unnerved to see large formations of the AoP across the river and quickly alerted Lee. Burnside had stolem a march on Lee but was stranded by the lack of pontoons.

On Thursday, November 20, the 1st Maine was relieved from the picket line and reported to Bayard at 7:00 p.m. where he ordered them to report to Reynolds' I Corps of Franklin's Left Grand Division. (Note: After taking command of the AoP, Burnside had reorganized it into three so-called grand divisions, organizations that included infantry corps, cavalry, and artillery, comprising 120,000 men. Maj. Gen. Edwin V. "Bull" Sumner's Right Grand Division consisted of Maj. Gen. Darius N. Couch's II Corps, Maj. Gen. William H. French's IX Corps, and Brig. Gen. Alfred Pleasonton's cavalry division. Maj. Gen. Joseph Hooker's Center Grand Division, had Brig. Gen. George Stoneman's III Corps, Maj. Gen. Daniel Butterfield's V Corps, and Brig. Gen. William W. Averell's cavalry brigade. Finally, Maj. Gen. William B. Franklin's Left Grand Division was made up of Reynolds' I Corps, Smith's VI Corps, and Bayard's cavalry brigade containing the 1st Maine - which would be the first regiment in the brigade to join Reynolds. 3,000 men of Maj. Gen. Franz Sigel's XI Corps were the AoP's Reserve in the area of Fairfax Court House. A further 3,000 of Maj. Gen. Henry W. Slocum's XII Corps were pulled from Harpers Ferry to Dumfries, Virginia, to join the AoP Reserve force on December 9, but none of the Reserve participated in the battle. For more information see the Battle of Fredericksburg and Battle of Fredericksburg order of battle: Union Wikipedia articles.) Reynolds was near Stafford Court House, about 27 miles (43 km) southeast by Acquia Creek and 8 miles (13 km) northnortheast of Fredericksburg.

After a hard march through thick woods, swamps, mud and mire, at 1:00 a.m., Friday morning, at the order to halt, the tired and weary troopers threw themselves on the wet ground and slept until daybreak. A second day's march in the rain closed with a second night of the same scout. On Friday, the weather was worse with torrential rain and fierce gusts of wind soaked the 1st Maine's riders despite their rubber ponchos. On the men continued southeast fording streams and rivers, climbing up and down rough and rocky hills, and passing through woods and cornfields until it reaching Reynolds' headquarters, when it turned round and backtracked over the same road several miles to camp in the woods near Aquia Creek. The men were cold, wet, hungry and exhausted without any rations; their horses were in the same condition, with no forage but a little miserable hay. The consensus was the march was the most uncomfortable night yet experienced, save those three terrible nights at Warrenton Junction the April before. Later in the day, Companies D, E, I, and K, under command of Capt. Taylor, scouted the railroad from Aquia Creek to Falmouth, the expected rout of some of the pontoons, but found no enemy.

Lee, expecting an imminent advance across the Rappahannock, assume the next defensible position to the south, the North Anna River. But when he saw how slowly Burnside was moving (and Confederate President Jefferson Davis expressed reservations about planning for a battle so close to Richmond), he directed all of his army toward Fredericksburg. By Sunday, November 23, James Longstreet's First Corps had arrived and Lee placed them on the soon to be infamous Marye's Heights to the west of town. He recalled Jackson from the valley midwwek, November 26, but his Second Corps commander had anticipated the need and began forced-marching his troops from Winchester on November 22, covering as many as 20 miles a day. Jackson arrived at Lee's headquarters on Saturday, November 29 and his divisions were deployed to prevent Burnside crossing downstream from Fredericksburg.

Heavy rains turned the roads to mud and slowed progress. A second pontoon train had been sent down the Potomac River to the town of Aquia Landing; from there, the train would travel overland the last few miles. With the roads impassable due to the mud, the overland train was diverted to the Potomac River, the pontoon boats were formed into rafts, and towed down river to Aquia Landing. The engineers and equipment did not arrive at Falmouth until November 25. By this time Lee's army was arriving, and the opportunity to cross the Rappahannock River uncontested was gone. Burnside still had an opportunity, however, because by then he was facing only half of Lee's army, not yet dug in, and if he acted quickly, he might have been able to attack Longstreet and defeat him before Jackson arrived. Once again he squandered his opportunity. The full complement of bridges arrived at the end of the month, but by this time Jackson was present and Longstreet was preparing strong defenses.

On the same day Longstreet's Corps had arrived opposite, the 1st Maine marched to Brooks Station, 5 miles (8.0 km) from the Landing at Acquia Creek, bringing up the rear of the I Corps. Here it remained, doing picket duty, at various points for two and a half weeks. Company B also made a reconnaissance about 15 miles (24 km) but found no enemy. The country was almost deserted, and an oppressive stillness reigned everywhere. Burnside's full complement of bridges finally arrived at the end of the month, but by this time Jackson was present and Longstreet was preparing strong defenses. With the rebels on the heights behind and downriver from the town, Burnside had to come up with a plan. A choice to cross downriver and east of Fredericksburg at Skinker's Neck was lost when the ANV saw Federal gunboats there and fired on them drawing Early's and D.H. Hill's divisions into that area, a movement seen by the AoP's balloon observers. Burnside guessed that the Confederates had weakened their left and center to concentrate against him on their right, so he decided to cross directly at Fredericksburg. In addition to his numerical advantage in troop strength, his army could not be attacked effectively because he had sited 220 artillery pieces across opposite the town on the ridge known as Stafford Heights to prevent any major counterattacks from the Rebels.

The 1st Maine continued scouting and screening along the river. On Thursday, December 4, Company G, which had been doing duty at Gen. Burnside's headquarter train since September 15, rejoined the regiment. On Sunday, December 7, the men had a taste of home in the shape of a cold snowstorm, which lasted from 8:00 a.m. until 11:00 p.m.

On Wednesday morning December 10, the 1st Maine marched for the front, reaching a point near the river, about noon. Assigned again to General Bayard's Brigade, the night was spent in the woods, near the river. Crossing the Rappahannock, next morning, on the lower pontoon, it supported Gibson's Battery through the day. The position was vigorously shelled, but the enemy's gunnery was not good. All the shells either passed over the heads of our men or fell short. At 10:00 p.m., the regiment recrossed the river and relieved the 2nd New York Cavalry, on picket below Fredericksburg.

Before dawn Thursday, December 11, Burnside'sn engineers began to assemble six pontoon bridges two just north of the town center, a third on the about 2 miles (3.2 km) southern end of town, and three 2 miles (3.2 km) further south, near the confluence of the Rappahannock and Deep Run. The bridging operations directly across from the city were fiercely resisted leading to an amphibious infantry assault to secure a small bridgehead and rout the sharpshooters at 3:00 p.m. Although some of the Confederates surrendered, fighting proceeded street by street through the town as the engineers completed the bridges. Sumner's Right Grand Division began crossing at 4:30 p.m., but the bulk of his men did not cross until December 12. Hooker's Center Grand Division crossed on December 13, using both the northern and southern bridges.

The 1st Maine, near Falmouth in the woods near the river, remained observers that day and witnessed first major urban combat of both the war and American history. The weather was intensely cold, and the worn-out uniforms of the men were but little protection for them. Friday morning, it crossed the river at 7:00 a.m., on the lowest town pontoon, and was in various positions during the forenoon, exposed to a heavy artillery fire most of the time. At about noon Companies G and K were detailed to support a section of flying artillery, which was in turn supporting the advanced line of skirmishers. While on this service the two companies advanced to the foot of Marye's Heights, but before the engagement became general, they were relieved by infantry and rejoined the regiment, which, drawn up in squadrons, was supporting Gibson's battery, 3rd United States Artillery. Scarcely had these two companies got into position when the enemy opened a vigorous artillery fire, which was kept up for some time, the shells passing over and bursting all around the regiment. It was a fearful ordeal, but the men stood their ground bravely and without flinching, though there was an "irresistible tendency to make polite obeisance when the peculiar ouiz, ouiz, ouiz of the shells was heard in the air," but one or two of the regiment were wounded, which was almost miraculous, considering its exposed position all day long. At dark the regiment went into bivouac, still under fire, expecting to remain there all night; but about ten o'clock it, in obedience to orders, recrossed the river, and marching six or seven miles below Falmouth, went on picket, relieving the 2nd New York Cavalry, where it remained quietly during December 13–14, until the great battle of Fredericksburg was over. During the battle Gen. Bayard was killed, and Col. David McMurtry Gregg, of the 8th Pennsylvania Cavalry (afterwards general) was put in command of the brigade.

Despite fierce efforts, the AoP was compelled to withdraw. During the battle, the 1st Maine lost its brigade commander, Brig. Gen. Bayard who was succeeded by General Gregg. After screening Burnside's withdrawal of the army across the pontoons, on Monday, December 15, the regiment was relieved from picket duty and recrossed the river into camp. On Tuesday, the 1st Maine moved to near Belle Plain Landing, where it went into winter quarters, the camp being named "Camp Bayard," in honor of the general. While there, it performed picket duty on the lower Rappahannock.

=== Hard service in 1863 ===
In camp before the onset of activity in the Spring, the 1st Maine as well as the entire of the cavalry of the Army of the Potomac received breech-loading carbines (two Michigan regiments received repeating Spencer rifles). The whole of the cavalry now had the firepower that would enable them to hold, tie down, and delay rebel infantry until their own infantry could arrive on the scene of battle. While not as rapid in fire as the later repeating carbines and rifles, the breech loaders still increased the rate of fire to three and four times that of the rebel muzzle-loading Enfields and Springfields and could outrange the rebel cavalry's shotguns. The standard trooper in the 1st was now armed with a saber, two Colt .44 "Army" pistols, and a single-shot Burnside breech-loading carbines (some kept privately purchased Sharps Carbines). As with the rest of the Cavalry Corps, the saber and pistols were for combat from the saddle and the carbine was for dismounted combat.

The year would be the turning point in the Eastern Theater, and the severity of the service to which the men of this regiment were subjected during the campaigns of 1863, may be inferred from a bare recital of the battles in which they were subsequently engaged and from data showing some of their heaviest losses. The battles, in addition to those above mentioned, occurred during the following campaigns/expeditions.

==== Stoneman's raid and the Chancellorsville Campaign ====
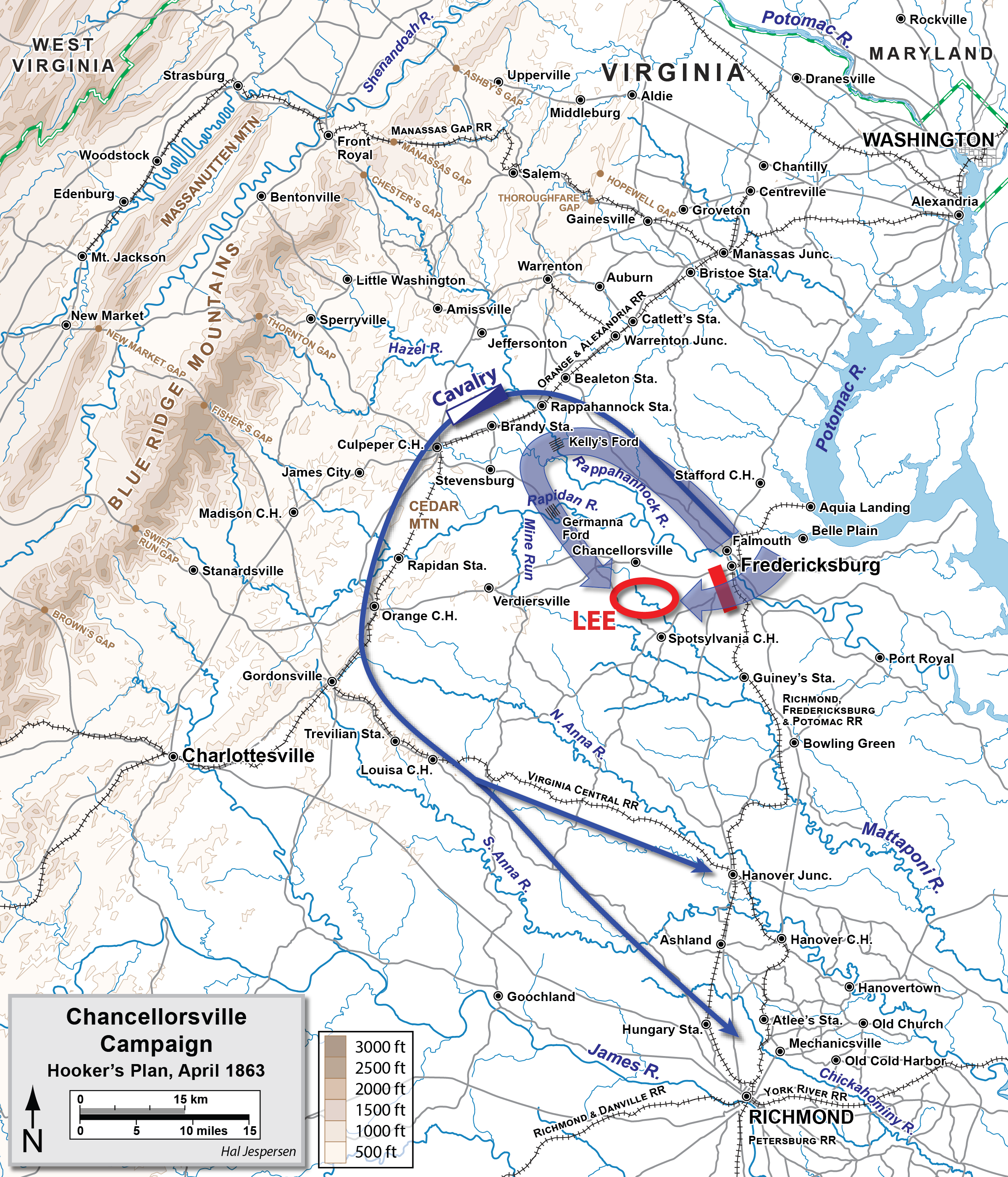
Hooker's plan for Stoneman's 1863 Raid during the Chancellorsville campaign Confederate Union

In April 1863, Maj. Gen. Joseph Hooker sent Maj. Gen. George Stoneman to cut Lee's line of supply on the Orange and Alexandria and Virginia Central Railroads at the town of Gordonsville. Hooker hoped Lee would withdraw from Fredericksburg since he would be cut off from supplies and transportation. Hooker assured Stoneman that he would keep in communications with him while he was on the raid. This expedition was also a significant change in the use of Federal Cavalry. The cavalry was beginning to expand from their traditional screening/scouting roles and add the role of a mounted strike force tasked with finding and fighting the enemy. Hooker directed Stoneman in his orders on April 12, 1863, "Let your watchword be fight, and let all your orders be fight, fight, fight."

The raid would be conducted with the men carrying light loads concentrating on weapons and ammunition. Sustenance for man and beast were to be taken from rebel territory. The 1st in the lead of Col. Kilpatrick's 1st Brigade of Brig. Gen. David McM. Gregg's 2nd Division seized the bridge across the river at Rappahannock Station, but further reconnaissance found the roads beyond to be nearly impassable in the rain and mud. The men's eagerness was thwarted as heavy spring rains kept the bulk of the force on the Federal side of the river looking for a suitable spot to get across in force. To keep the force undetected, Stoneman had given the order that no fires would be allowed after dark for the duration of the march.

Rebel scouts had noticed some cavalry moving out of Falmouth but were ignorant of its intent. The 1st Maine's LT Stone of Company A was acting as the assistant brigade quartermaster when he was captured by a small party of Mosby's Rangers and taken to Warrenton to get back across the river for interrogation. The rain had increased the size and speed of the river at the ford so that his captors were reluctant to move into the stream. To goad his men, the party's commander, a LT Paine, spurred his horse into the river, and was promptly swept off. Despite being a prisoner, Paine moved into the river downstream, while his other captors dithered and grabbed his captor saving his life. In return, he was promised he would be sent directly to Lee's headquarters with a recommendation to be returned without exchange as reward for this act. While being transported to Richmond, Paine, on Stone's horse, and his party were in turn captured by the 8th Illinois in Col. Horace B. Sargent's 1st Brigade of Brig. Gen. William W. Averell's 1st Division of this expedition. Stone spent barely a week away from the regiment and was back with his horse by Wednesday, April 22.

By the evening of April 19, Stoneman had the command shed "all men and horses not in good condition, and all extra baggage, to the rear, and prepare for long and rapid marches, day and night, as the cavalry was about to show an indulgent government that the money and pains taken to render this arm of the service efficient was not thrown away.'" The rain and the mud still hindered the force to the extent that by Wednesday, April 22, the 1st Maine found itself in Warrenton, VA still on the Federal side of the river. The men found a respite in that being within a town, they were allowed to light fires. They remained in Warrenton through Saturday, April 25.

===== Moving out =====
On April 25, the orders were modified to cross the Rappahannock north-west of Fredericksburg on the evening of the 28th, or the morning of the 29th, and move in two columns, operating on the line of the Orange & Alexandria railroad and Culpeper Road. After moving out during the night of April 28/29, the column was in motion, and before noon was at Kelly's ford, on the Rappahannock, where it crossed on a pontoon bridge. Once across, the force dismounted a short distance beyond the river until dark when they mounted up and moved toward Richmond. Keeping the horses saddled and the men under arms, Stoneman split his force in three for the next day's movement. Once again, Stoneman had his subordinates cull any men or mounts deemed unfit for the remainder of the expedition sent back across the river.

The 1st Maine was in Kilpatrick's 1st Brigade of Gregg's 2nd Division riding with Stoneman to arrive on the Virginia Central's rail line at Louisa Courthouse southeast of Gordonsville from the southeast while Averell's 1st Division with three brigades would come down the Orange & Alexandria from the north. A beefed-up reserve brigade with four regular cavalry and one volunteer regiments under Brig. Gen. John Buford followed equidistant behind the two wings. The operations the next day, the 30th, after crossing, consisted in driving in the outposts which were encountered on both roads. The 1st provided security for crossing the Rapidan at Raccoon ford, and troopers were pleased to find that the copper and brass rounds for their carbines were unaffected by the fording of the swollen streams and the torrential rains.

Still not lighting campfires to avoid rebel detection, the forces continued their advance south through Unionville and Thornhill to get between the Army of Northern Virginia and Richmond and east of Gordonsville. unopposed by any significant opposition. This had a further positive effect on the Federal Cavalrymen's self-esteem as well as a break in the weather. The men of the 1st noted that they were capturing prisoners, weapons, horses, mules, and fodder with every small skirmish yet they were seeing no signs of the Army of Northern Virginia's retreat from the vicinity of Fredericksburg. Instead, the men of the 1st saw the tracks of infantry and cavalry heading to Fredericksburg and points upriver on the Rappahannock. Stoneman reported these indications back to Hooker, but received no response so was unaware of the result of his intelligence.

===== Arriving at Louisa =====
After slogging through rain and fog for three days, with the 1st Maine acting as its division's rear guard, the rains cleared as they crossed the North Anna River. On May 1, the unit rotated to the advance guard and at 01:00 (at night) on May 2, arrived at Louisa Courthouse on the Virginia Central Railroad thirteen miles southwest of the junction at Gordonsville. Stoneman consolidated his forces at Louisa Court House on the Virginia Central Railroad at 10:00 where they began destroying the rails and equipment found there. He had Averell come south through Gordonsville to meet him at Louisa. As he waited for Averell, Stoneman sent the regular officer, the 1st Maine's Adjutant, Capt. Tucker, with its Companies B and I northwest up the railway toward Gordonsville to find the enemy. Stoneman had not heard anything from Hooker and was unaware of any effect that his presence and actions were having on Lee's army. Men of the 1st and the rest of the force were ignorant of the impending doom facing XI Corp roughly 30 miles to the northeast.

Three miles outside Louisa, the two companies made contact and drove back the rebel pickets only to find themselves facing five companies of rebel cavalry. They managed to cut their way out of an encirclement and made it back to the main force. Stoneman opted to send out small parties to destroy as much infrastructure and supplies as possible from his stop at Louisa. Averell joined him on May 3. While these forays had commenced, Stoneman received orders that day from Hooker (the first communication sent his way since crossing the Rappahannock) recalling him to the main body of the Army of the Potomac then heavily engaged at Chancellorsville. At the same time, he was seeing the limit of endurance for his men and horses nearing.

Stoneman began sending patrols east toward the Richmond, Fredericksburg and Potomac Railroad on May 4, with the intent to move closer between Richmond and Fredericksburg and destroy as much rail equipment and military supplies as he could on the way back to the army. The 1st drew rear guard duty again and were instructed to build large numbers of fires around Louisa to deceive the 500 odd rebel cavalrymen who had mixed it up with Capt. Tucker and monitored the expedition from a distance. Instead of going into camp for the night, the column headed east on the Richmond Pike, a clear macadamized road. Making good progress on the hardtop, the column halted at Thompson's Crossroads. Stoneman again divided his force into several expeditions sent out in different directions.

The 1st Maine, with Gregg, was sent to Rockville fifteen miles northwest of Richmond and west of Ashland Station on the Richmond, Fredericksburg, and Potomac line. From there even smaller detachments fanned out. After burning bridges across creeks and rivers, firing warehouses, and rolling stock, on May 6, Gregg moved his group north to rejoin Stoneman.

As the elements were regrouping, Stoneman found that a brigade-sized contingent under Kilpatrick (not including the 1st Maine) sent southeast had been cut off by an aroused rebel cavalry and forced to return to Union lines down at Yorktown. Unknown to him, the rebels having defeated Hooker were turning their attention to the raiders. As he was finding out, "To take the enemy by surprise and penetrate his country was easy enough; to withdraw from it was a more difficult matter."

===== Heading back =====
To keep the rebel forces marshalling against him from seizing the initiative, Stoneman had sent Buford back to Louisa and Gordonsville on May 5. With the 1st rotated back to the advance guard, the force crossed the Pamunkey River and made camp to wait for its outliers to return. By May 6, Buford had returned to Stoneman. Crossing the Rapidan again at Raccoon ford, the force was shadowed by ever increasing numbers of rebel horsemen on the 7th reaching Kelly's ford at midnight. The three days of rain made the ford risky to cross in the darkness.

At daybreak on May 8, Stoneman's remaining force began swimming across the Rappahannock with the men of the 1st Maine again realizing no debilitating effect on their metal carbine cartridges. At the end of the day, the 1st Maine was one of the first units of the expedition to get to the encampment at Bealton, twenty miles upriver from the Army of the Potomac's headquarters at Falmouth. By May 10, all the regiments less Kilpatrick's were reunited at Bealton. While bone weary, the Federal cavalrymen were in high morale in stark contrast to the rest of the army stung by a particularly galling defeat at the Battle of Chancellorsville.

===== Aftermath =====
This raid took a toll on the regiment, but it and the rest of the army's cavalry branch were gaining in combat effectiveness. Regardless of the success or failure of the daring Stoneman's raid, it instilled a growing sense of competence and confidence among the men of the Federal cavalry. Chaplain Merrill called the raid "one of the most remarkable achievements in the history of modern warfare" and one of the men encapsulated the new-found confidence writing, "It was ever after a matter of pride with the boys that they were on Stoneman's Raid." Reflecting on the raid twenty years later, Edward Tobie wrote:

Starting with but two days' rations, after that was gone the boys lived on ham, flour and meal obtained from the country, cooked when they had time to cook, and eaten raw when necessary. As for rest and sleep, five nights there was no sleep exceed what was stolen in the saddles, and the rations of sleep were short and of an inferior quality during the rest of the time; some of the men seemed demented at times from loss of sleep, and acted half crazed. Three days and nights there was continuous marching, fighting, scouting, and picketing, and in fact pretty much of the whole time the boys had been actively employed.

==== Gettysburg campaign ====
Regrouping, resupplying, and training further with their new carbines, the regiment prepared for the next engagement. Although the morale of the Cavalry Corps was high due to the perceived success of Stoneman's Raid, Hooker used Stoneman as a scapegoat and relieved him of command. The 1st Maine remained under Kilpatrick in the 1st Brigade of Gregg's 3rd Division. The brigade was joined by a company of cavalry from the District of Columbia under Capt. William H Orton (who would later join the 1st Maine the following year with the remainder of the 1st DC Cavalry). Brig. Gen. Pleasanton was promoted to command the Corp with Brig. Gen. Buford taking over his 1st Division.

After Chancellorsville, Lee began an invasion up the Shenandoah into the Maryland and Pennsylvania with two goals in mind. The first was to attack the US public's will to fight, and the second was to give the agricultural economy of northern Virginia a chance to rebound from the Army of the Potomac and produce a harvest that could sustain the rebel armies in the field by foraging and plundering the lush, productive country of south central Pennsylvania. To do this successfully, he would need Maj. Gen. Stuart's Confederate cavalry force to scout and screen for his main body. This would lead to the 1st Maine having an eventful experience during the ensuing Gettysburg Campaign.

===== Brandy Station =====
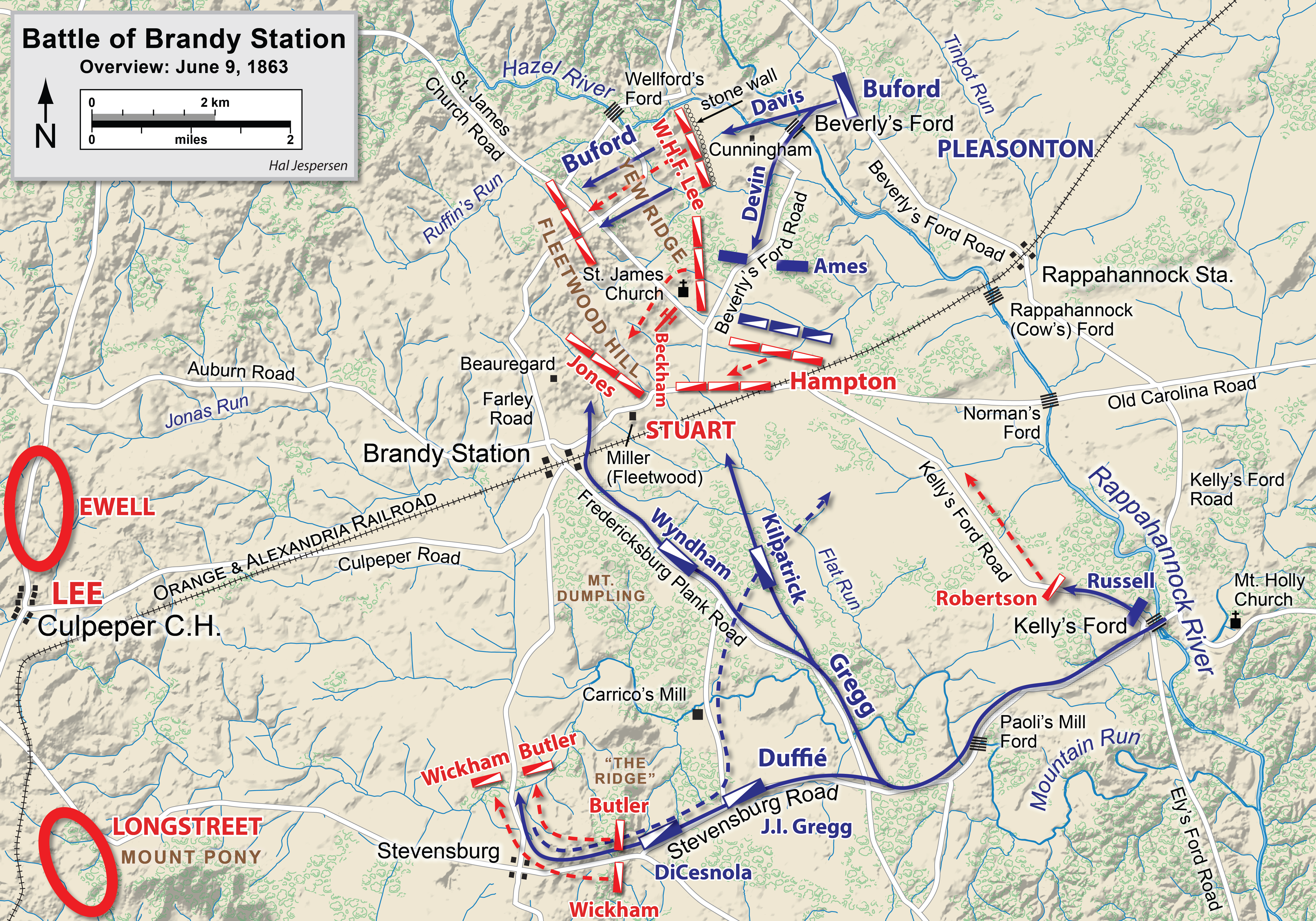
Overview of the Battle of Brandy Station Confederate Union

[Brandy Station] 'made' the Federal cavalry. Up to that time confessedly inferior to the Southern horsemen, they gained on this day that confidence in themselves and in their commanders which enable them to contest so fiercely the subsequent battle-fields ...

— Major Henry B. McClellan, Stuart's adjutant

Around Brandy Station, Stuart had about 9,500 men in five cavalry brigades, led by Brig. Gens. Hampton, Robertson, and Jones, and COL Munford (temporarily commanding Lee's brigade), plus horse artillery. He was unaware that Pleasanton had organized his command into two wings of 11,000 men across the Rappahannock River. Buford, accompanied by Pleasanton, led the right wing of three cavalry brigades and horse artillery augmented by an infantry brigade from the V Corps. The 1st Maine rode in the left wing, led by Gregg, similarly composed and augmented in the 3rd Cavalry Division, led by Gregg. To remove the threat of Stuart raiding his supply lies from Brandy Station, Hooker ordered Pleasonton to make a "spoiling raid", to "disperse and destroy" the Confederates. In Pleasonton's attack plan, the 1st Maine in Gregg's wing would cross at Kelly's Ford, six miles (10 km) downstream to the southeast of Brandy station as the left pincer in a planned double envelopment. Buford's wing would cross further north at Beverly Ford. At dawn on June 9, 1863, the U.S. forces advanced.

Buford's wing made first contact and surprised the Confederates at St. James Church. Buford failed to turn the Confederate left and dislodge the artillery that was blocking the direct route to Brandy Station. Men of the 1st Maine could hear cannon fire from Buford's force as they crossed Kelly's Ford. After initial heavy losses, Buford's men were amazed to see the Confederates began pulling back. Gregg's wing, finding their planned route blocked by Robertson's brigade, found a completely unguarded and more circuitous route surprising the rebels and forcing the withdrawal from Buford.

The 1st Maine was in the second bride to arrive on scene. Between Gregg and Buford at St. James battle was Fleetwood Hill, Stuart's headquarters the previous night, which Stuart and most of his staff had left for St. James Church. A howitzer, left in the rear because of inadequate ammunition, fired a few shots that delayed the Union advance as they sent out skirmishers and returned cannon fire. When the first brigade in Gregg's wing under Col. Wyndham charged up the western slope of Fleetwood and neared the crest they put to flight, the lead elements of Jones's brigade, which had just withdrawn from St. James Church. Wyndham set up a battery on the hill next to the rebel howitzer. The 1st Maine, in the next brigade, led by Col. Kilpatrick, swung around east of Brandy Station and formed up on the southern end and the eastern slope of Fleetwood Hill on the right of Wyndham's brigade. A furious scrap began with charges moving back and forth over the hill by Wyndham and his foe, Jones.

Kilpatrick kept feeding his brigade into the fight alongside Wyndham's brigade and seemed to be gaining the upper hand. His former regiment, the 2nd New York (also known as the Harris Light Cavalry) flooded up the hill, only to discover that their appearance coincided with the arrival of Hampton's brigade, with a battery of five guns to augment the howitzer, who drove them back over the crest and captured the Federal battery. The regiment was shattered and fled back down the hill. While rallying the remnants of his old regiment, Kilpatrick galloped up to Col. Douty asking, "Colonel Douty, what can you do with your regiment?" Douty answered confidently, "I can drive the rebels." At that, Kilpatrick turned to the regiment and shouted, "Men of Maine! You must save the day! Follow me!" This call had an immediate effect on the regiment.

With a shout at the top of their lungs, "in one solid mass this splendid regiment circled first to the right, and then moving in a straight line at a run struck the rebel columns in flank. The shock was terrific! Down went the rebels before this wild rush of maddened horses, men, biting sabres, and whistling balls." The charge of the 1st Maine saved the Federal guns near Fleetwood Hill from capture. The Federal battery was manned and withdrew off the hill.

During the charge and pursuit, the regiment separated into two groups. One remained near the crest of Fleetwood Hill mopping up in melee with dismounted rebels. Some of the regiment dismounted and opened fire with their carbines on Confederates withdrawing to the north along the crest. Lt. Col. Smith, in command of this contingent, soon found himself alone and almost cut off. He quickly rallied and gathered more than half the regiment around him. Once gathered, Smith led his group down the hill to join Col. Douty. As they left the crest, no one manned or removed the Confederate guns on the crest.

Col. Douty, meanwhile, was with the other group further along in pursuit of fleeing rebel horsemen and began trying to reform this group to avoid a dissipation of his combat power. Douty quickly realized while the chase had carried them over a mile of open ground, he had woods on either side into which rebels had fled. As he rallied his command, he could see the enemy massing for an attack in his rear. He formed his group in column and charged the still-forming line of Hampton's men. He smashed through the line, wheeled around on the other side, and charged again thoroughly scattering the rebel troopers.

As Smith and his contingent came up to meet Douty, they realized that they were surrounded. The rebels had flooded back toward the hill in small groups including artillerymen who had taken back their abandoned guns. The two groups rallied around Col. Doughty and Lt. Col. Smith. With Smith in the lead, the regiment advanced on the battery at pace "as if inviting death". Firing from the rebels died off as their troopers moved out of the battery's line of fire and the gunners sighted their guns. When Smith saw the battery preparing to fire, he ordered the column to turn right just before the guns fired loads of grape and shell. The abrupt move left the discharge tearing through empty space and the column reformed before the battery could reposition their weapons and swept around to the right of the crest.

The regiment lost no men in the last action and made it back over the crest to the origin of their charge. In the last action, the Maine men had learned the valuable lesson that that cohesion gave them power and safety in numbers as demonstrated in Douty's two charges in the open ground and Smith's turn to dodge grape and shell from the rebels. Several sweeps over the hill during the day had left it remaining in Confederate hands. Near sunset, Pleasonton ordered a general withdrawal, and the ten-hour battle was over.

The 1st Maine's losses in casualties and prisoners were almost all troopers who had been separated from the main two bodies. All told, this action had cost the regiment one killed, two wounded, seven ·wounded and taken prisoner, and twenty-eight taken prisoner. They had also taken seventy-six rebel prisoners and 2nd South Carolina's colors. Two rebel artillery pieces were taken off the hill but abandoned in the withdrawal back across the Rappahannock.

Much like the earlier raid (that is, not really succeeding in its initial objectives) the men of the 1st Maine gained more confidence from their action. Although a rebel tactical victory (although derided as a defeat in rebel press as a defeat), for the first time in the War, they matched the rebel cavalry in skill and determination. As they recouped, Edward P. Tobie observed, "[A] higher value attaches to Brandy Station as affecting the [1st Maine]. ... It was ... the first time it had ever tasted ... the fruit of victory. The battle aroused its latent powers, and awoke it ... to a new career. It became self-reliant, and began to comprehend its own possibilities. It became inspired with an invincible spirit that never again forsook it."

Of note, the battle had "indisputably delayed Robert E. Lee's advance northward by one full day" which would have a knock-on effect on the Army of Northern Virginia and its movements in the remainder of the campaign.

===== Battle of Aldie =====
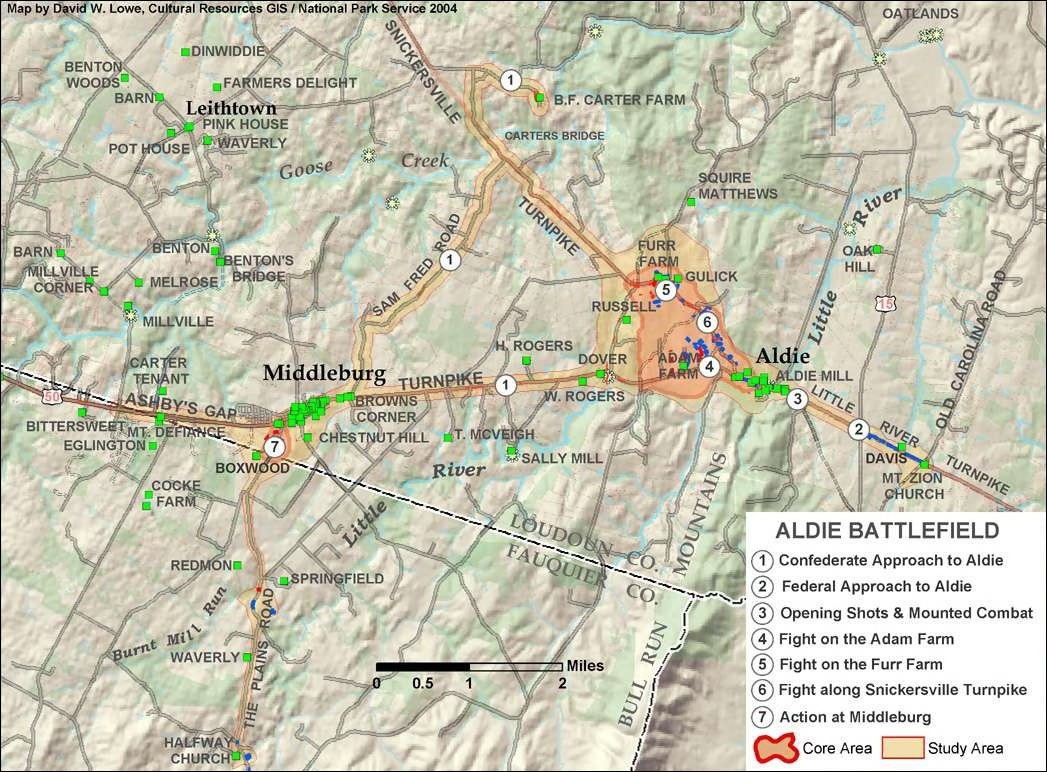
Map of battlefield core and study areas.

The Battle of Aldie took place on June 17, 1863, in Loudoun County, Virginia. It was the first in a series of small battles along the Ashby's Gap Turnpike in which Stuart's forces successfully delayed Pleasonton's thrust across the Loudoun Valley, depriving him of the opportunity to locate the Army of Northern Virginia which was trying to get a jump on the Army of the Potomac into Pennsylvania via the Shenandoah Valley.

Despite the positive performance of the Cavalry Corps at Brandy Station Hooker grew increasingly frustrated with Pleasonton's inability to locate Lee's main body. Pleasonton reorganized his corps again from two wings into three divisions. He relieved Col. Alfred N. Duffié, a French-born officer, with the 1st Maine's brigade commander, Kilpatrick. The Maine men were now part of Gregg's 2nd Division's 3rd Brigade now commanded by Gregg's cousin, Col. John Irvin Gregg. Pleasonton took Company I to serve as escorts and orderlies at his headquarters. Company L detached, under Capt. Constantine Taylor to do the same at Maj. Gen. John F. Reynolds 's I Corps' headquarters. The remaining ten companies stayed under Col. Douty's command in the 3rd Brigade.

On June 17, Pleasonton decided to push the 2nd Division twenty miles from Manassas Junction westward down the Little River Turnpike to Aldie. Aldie was tactically important in that near the village the Little River Turnpike intersected both the Ashby's Gap Turnpike and Snicker's Gap Turnpike, which respectively led through Ashby's Gap and Snickers Gap in the Bull Run Mountains, a ridge east of the Blue Ridge Mountain into the valley. The 1st Maine arrived there with the 3rd Brigade at 14:00 to find a severe cavalry fight already underway.

Just east of the village Kilpatrick's division led by 1st Massachusetts had driven Col. Thomas T. Munford's's pickets back upon initial contact through the town. Around the same time, the rest of Munford's brigade under the Col. Williams Carter Wickham arrived at Dover Mills, a small hamlet on the Little River west of Aldie where the U.S. forces realized that Munford's regiments outnumbered them. The rebels set up a position west of the town that controlled the road leading from it. Wickham ordered Col. Thomas L. Rosser to take the 5th Virginia to locate a campsite closer to Aldie. As they moved east, they ran into and easily drove back Kilpatrick's right flank regiment, the 1st Massachusetts, through Aldie to the main Union body. Rosser pulled back through town and deployed west along a ridge that covered the two roads leading out of Aldie and waited the arrival of Munford. As Rosser withdrew west, he repulsed a swift counterattack by 1st Massachusetts and 4th New York securing his hold on the Ashby's Gap Turnpike with a sharpshooter detachment under Capt. Boston behind a stonewall east of the William Adam farmhouse at the foot of the hill at Snicker's Gap.

Kilpatrick then turned his attention towards the Snicker's Gap Turnpike. As Mumford brought forward the 1st, 2nd, 3rd, and 4th Virginia Cavalry, an artillery duel ensued. A furious fight erupted, which at first went in favor of Munford as Federal charges were met, stopped, and then forced back by the withering volley of sharpshooters entrenched along a stone wall. The 1st Massachusetts Cavalry was trapped in a blind curve on the west of Snicker's Gap Turnpike and was mauled, losing 198 of 294 men in the eight companies that were engaged. Gregg sent the 1st Maine to the left to report to Kilpatrick on his left. When Gregg found himself actively engaged in close combat on the east side of the hill at Snicker's Gap Turnpike, he recalled the 1st Maine ordering them to wheel right and attack over the crest with sabers drawn. Douty had only six companies with him as four under Lt. Col. Smith had gone too far west to recall.

As Douty formed the companies, they were met by Kilpatrick and the withdrawing 1st Massachusetts:

Kilpatrick was among them, but when he saw an unbroken front of live men, with glistening sabres drawn, he instantly stopped. His moistened features were covered with dust; his countenance was dejected and sad; the fire and the flash of his eyes were gone, and he looked indeed "a ruined man". "What regiment is this?" he asked, in tones that did not betray him. "First Maine!" shouted a dozen throats. The response was electric. Then we heard the· old, familiar, clear-ringing tones, and saw his countenance brighten to a smile, his eyes flash, and his whole frame fill with enthusiasm, as commanded: "Forward. First Maine! You saved the field at Brandy Station, and you can do it here! Are there twelve men who will follow me?" He turned instantly, and forty boys of Co. H, followed by Co. D. with deafening yells and flashing sabres, charged down the hill and met the victorious rebels, brave, bold, determined fellows, just at the road, and in an instant we were among them; nor would they turn till they felt the steel borne by braver and stronger arms than theirs.

Col. Doughty and Capt. Summat were on the extreme left of the regiment as they had been between the fourth and fifth company in the line of march. As Kilpatrick turned around to the rebels, Doughty and Summat galloped alongside him in front of the rest of the regiment. The regiment cleared all rebels before it. On its right, the 6th Ohio overran Boston's detachment at the stonewall beyond the Adam farmhouse on Ashby's Gap Turnpike, capturing or killing most of his men. As the charge met the rebels, Lt. Col. Smith had rejoined and immediately fell in the sweep down the hill. In the ensuing action, three sergeants of Company H captured the colors of the 4th Virginia. As the tide finally turned in the fading light, the Maine troopers found Col. Doughty and Capt. Summat fatally shot from their saddles. Lt. Col. Smith assumed command of the regiment.

The fighting died down around 20:00 as Munford withdrew his command west towards Middleburg. Despite Pleasonton's tactical victory, Munford had accomplished his mission of keeping Hooker from knowing Lee's location.

Despite their high morale from their successful charge and the capture of enemy colors, the 1st Maine had suffered the notable loss of its commander, Col. Douty, as well as a popular company commander, Capt. Summat. The scrap had been costly with the loss from this battle being five men killed, one mortally wounded, seventeen wounded, one mortally wounded and taken prisoner, one wounded and taken prisoner, four taken prisoner, and over 200 horses – a significant blow to the command.

===== Middleburg =====
While the 1st Maine was fighting at Aldie, Stuart had established his headquarters at Middleburg (3 miles (4.8 km) west of Aldie down the Winchester Pike as it rises to cross the mountains into the Shenandoah) and scattered his brigades throughout the Loudoun Valley to watch for enemy activity. Early in the morning of June 18, Col. Duffié, had taken the 280 men of the 1st Rhode Island Cavalry westward from the Army of the Potomac's camp near Centreville. Pleasonton had ordered him to camp at Middleburg that evening and then to proceed the next day toward Noland's Ferry, extending his march to the west as far as Snickersville. Duffié crossed the Bull Run Mountains at Thoroughfare Gap at 9:30 a.m., easily pushing aside pickets from John R. Chambliss's brigade. Confederate commanders could not believe that a small Union regiment would dare to travel so deep into enemy territory without an escort, so Chambliss did not aggressively attack, fearing that the column was the advance element of a much larger enemy force. Duffié continued on his isolated march, turning to the north by 11:00 a.m. and heading for Middleburg as ordered.

Arriving there about 4:00 p.m., Wednesday, June 17, Duffié drove in the few Confederate pickets deployed there and disrupted Stuart's evening of socializing with local ladies. Stuart and his staff quickly retreated to Rector's Crossroads, the location of his closest brigade. He ordered Beverly Robertson to move immediately to Middleburg to crush the Union cavalry. Duffié barricaded the streets of Middleburg, dismounted half of his regiment behind stonewalls, and sent for help from Judson Kilpatrick's brigade near Aldie. At 7:00 a.m., Thursday morning, Stuart's attack routed the vastly outnumbered Rhode Islanders. Many of Duffié's men were captured the next morning as Chambliss cut off their escape route. The Parisian colonel finally returned to Centreville with only 4 officers and 27 men. A few stragglers eventually rejoined the shattered remnants of the regiment. Duffié would never again serve with the Army of the Potomac, although he did command cavalry in other Union armies. The Union casualties on July 17 were reported as 250.

In response to Duffié's report, Pleasonton tentatively sent probes towards Ashby's and Snicker's Gaps. Mi-afternoon Thursday, Gregg's division ran into Confederate pickets around Middleburg. On contact, Stuart quickly fell back to a commanding ridge one-half mile (800 m) west of town. Gregg attacked Stuart's line on a ridge west of Middleburg. Stuart repulsed Gregg's charge, counterattacked, then fell back to his defensive positions on the ridge. Fearing a trap, a cautious Pleasonton ordered Gregg to withdraw to Aldie.

Meanwhile, the 1st Maine spent Thursday skirmishing and reconnoitering the enemy's position without any loss between to the north and east of Aldie. The terrain surrounding the town was cpen and undulating with belts of woods until the rise to the heavily wooded ridge masking the Shenandoah. On Friday morning, Pleasonton again sent Gregg against Middleburg, who sent his first cousin's, Col. J. Irvin Gregg's, brigade at the Rebels while Buford's division swung north towards Pot House (New Lisbon). After a flanking march, Buford eventually occupied the ground around Pot House, pushing back two regiments of William "Grumble" Jones's brigade in a mild skirmish.

After a hard fight to clear reinforced pickets from Middleburg and ending up on the south side of the Turnpike, Gregg saw that he needed more assets to take on Robertson's position on the high ground beyond the town. Kilpatrick sent the 1st Maine and the 10th New York Cavalry regiments to help extend the Federal line across the Winchester Turnpike and into the field and woods north of it, and Gregg slowly advanced. The temperature hovered around 98 °F throughout the afternoon, sapping men and horses of energy. The 1st Maine straddled the turnpike with the 10th New York on its right.

At 10:00 a.m., the 1st Maine left its duties screening a battery of the 2nd U.S. Artillery and advanced up the Winchester Turnpike 2 miles (3.2 km), and took a position in the woods on the left, or south of the pike, to support Gregg's skirmishers. The Rebels made some small forays that the U.S. cavalry repelled. Around midday, the regiment was ordered to advance through the woods, and companies M and E, on its left charged through the woods and across an open field to a stone wall, where, after a sharp engagement, they captured a Lt. Col. three line officers, and twenty-one enlisted men from the Rebel cavalry. Two other companies charged through the woods on its right driving superior numbers of Stuart's troopers to a point where the belt of woods crossed the piko, where they united with the rest of the 1st Maine and charged directly up the pike. This scrap on the pike was the heaviest and hottest contest of the regiment's day. As the regiment came whole, the Rebel cavalry charged down to, and nearly through, the entire Union line, only to he hurled back with heavy loss. The regiment drove Stuart's troops from the woods into an open field between the ridge and the woods. There, the 1st Maine and all its comnpatriots fought fiercely to drive the Rebels from the ridge line.

As Stuart's forces fell back over the crest, the remainder of Kilpatrick's brigade joined Gregg's line. The 1st Maine fought fiercely on and beside the pike as the entire U.S. battle line gained the ridge, only to see beyond the belt of woods Brig. Gen. BG Fitzhugh Lee's large cavalry reserve already moving out to charge upon them which momentarily checked the advance before forcing the U.S. horsemen back over the ridge. At this point, Buford sent the U.S. Reserve Brigade back from Pot House, and the 2nd and 6th U.S. Cavalry regiments came into the fray, "like the whirlwind," and struck the enemy with a heavy shock, too heavy to be resisted, giving no breathing time given to the Rebel troopers to reform. This charge liced through and over Stuart's menn blue, "till it was no longer a battle, but a rout, and the rebel line of battle was completely broken, not to be formed again." The fierce fighting continued in isolated pockets with ground in the belt of woods was hotly contested. The Union cavalry finally forced Stuart's horse artillery to withdraw and occupied the positions the Rebels held at the opening of the fight, while the latter had retired across the open fields beyond the ridge. Stuart had been forced back along the turnpike into the Shenandoah to stonewalls beyond a ravine along a stream known as Kirk's Branch. A still cautious Pleasonton refused to follow up his success and ordered his men to rest and send out pickets.

In his official report on the following Tuesday, June 23, Col. Smith now commanding the regiment, wrote that the 1st Maine lost three officers killed and one wounded, and seven enlisted men killed and twenty-six wounded.

=== Union cavalry supremacy 1864–1865 ===
It also moved with the cavalry corps on Gen. Sheridan's first raid. May 9, 1864, until within 3 miles of Richmond. In the engagement at Trevilian Station, June 24, 1864, its loss was 10 officers and 58 enlisted men. During August of this year its loss in killed, wounded and missing was 49 men and 75 horses, and the total casualties during 1864 amounted to 295 officers and enlisted men.

In August 1864, seven companies of the 1st D. C. cavalry were transferred and assigned to the several companies of this regiment by a special order of the war department. The original members of the regiment whose term of service expired November 4, 1864, were mustered out at Augusta, ME, on November 25, while the regiment, now composed of veterans, recruits and members of the 1st D. C. cavalry whose term had not expired, participated in the closing battles of the war; was mustered out of the U. S. service at Petersburg, VA, August 1, 1865, and arrived in Augusta, ME., on August 9, 1865.

Joshua Chamberlain, in his book "Passing of Armies" states that the First Maine Calavlry was at the Appomattox fighting with General Sheridan. Chamberlain says:

"I was proud to learn that Smith's Brigade-our First Maine Cavalry in the van had waged the most critical part of the glorious fight."

== Affiliations, battle honors, detailed service, and casualties ==
=== Organizational affiliation ===
The 1st Maine Volunteer Cavalry Regiment was organized at Augusta, ME and served with the following organizations:

- March 1862, Miles' Brigade defending Baltimore and Ohio Railroad (2nd Battalion)
- April 1862, Hatch's Cavalry Brigade. Brig., Banks' V Corps, and Department of the Shenandoah (2nd Battalion).
- March 1862, Abercrombie's Cavalry Brigade, McDowell's Department of the Rappahannock (1st and 3rd Battalions)
- April 1862, Bayard's Cavalry Brigade, Department of the Rappahannock (1st and 3rd Battalions).
- May 1862, Edward Ord's Divisional Cavalry, McDowell's Department of the Rappahannock. (1st and 3rd Battalions)
- June 1862, Bayard's Cavalry Brigade, III Corps, Army of Virginia (Reunited Regiment.).
- September 1–14, 1862, Bayard's Cavalry Brigade, Cavalry Division, Army of the Potomac.
- September 14–17, Porter's V Corps Esort, Army of the Potomac (Company A)
- September 14–17, Reno's IX Corps Esort, Army of the Potomac (Company G)
- September 14–November 2, Cavalry Division Unattached, Williams' XII Corps, Army of the Potomac (Remainder of Regiment)
- December 11–15, Reynolds' I Corps Esort, Franklin's Left Grand Division, Army of the Potomac (Company L)
- November 2–December 15, Bayard's Cavalry Brigade, Newton's 3rd Division, Smith's VI Corps, Franklin's Left Grand Division, Army of the Potomac (Remainder of Regiment)
- December 31, 1862, Gregg's's Cavalry Brigade, III Corps, Army of the Potomac.
- February 1863, 1st Brig., 3rd Division, Cavalry Corps, Army of the Potomac.
- June 1863, 3rd Brig., 2nd Division, Cavalry Corps, Army of the Potomac.
- August 1863, 2nd Brig., 2nd Division, Cavalry Corps, Army of the Potomac.
- October 1864, 3rd Brig., 2nd Division, Cavalry Corps, Army of the Potomac.
- May 1865, Department of Virginia

Mustered out August 1, 1865.

=== List of battles ===
The official list of battles in which the regiment bore a part:

- First Battle of Winchester
- Battle of Cedar Mountain
- Battle of White Sulphur Springs
- Second Battle of Bull Run
- Battle of South Mountain
- Battle of Antietam
- Battle of Fredericksburg
- Second Battle of Rappahannock Station
- Battle of Brandy Station
- Battle of Aldie
- Battle of Middleburg
- Battle of Upperville
- Battle of Gettysburg
- Battle of Shepherdstown
- Battle of Mine Run
- Kilpatrick's Raid on Richmond
- Battle of Old Church
- Battle of Todd's Tavern
- Ground Squirrel Bridge
- Battle of Haw's Shop
- Battle of Cold Harbor
- Battle of Trevilian Station
- Battle of Saint Mary's Church
- First Battle of Deep Bottom
- Second Battle of Ream's Station
- Battle of Vaughan Road
- Battle of Boydton Plank Road
- The Bellfield Raid

=== Detailed service ===
==== 1861 ====
- Organized at Augusta and mustered on November 5, 1861.

==== 1862 ====
- Regiment ordered to Washington DC
- Companies "A," "D," "E" and "F" transit March 14–19
- Companies "B," "I," "H" and "M" transit March 19–24
- Companies "C," "G," "K" and "L" transit March 19–28
- Companies "A," "B," "E," "H" and *'M" (1st Battalion)
- Ordered to Harper's Ferry, WV, and guard duty along Baltimore & Ohio Railroad March 31 – May 19
- Moved to Strasburg and operations in the Shenandoah Valley May 15 – June 17
- Action at Woodstock May 21
- Strasburg (Cos. "H" and "M") May 22
- Middletown May 24
- Winchester May 25
- Retreat to Williamsport May 25–26
- Winchester June 3. Milford June 24
- Reconnaissance to Front Royal June 29–30.
- Luray June 30.
- Rejoin Regiment at Warrenton July 10.
- Companies "C," "D," "F," "G," "I," "K" and "L" (Regiment, 2nd and 3rd Battalions)
- Depart Washington, DC for Warrenton Junction, VA April 5
- Fairfax Court House April 5
- Manassas Junction April 6
- Warrenton Junction April 7
- In camp at Warrenton Junction April 7 – May 12
- Reconnaissance to the Rappahannock April 15 (Co. "C")
- Reconnaissance to Liberty Church, VA April 16 (Detachment)
- Reconnaissance to Culpeper Court House, VA May 4–5.
- Move via Elk Run and Stafford Court House to Falmouth, VA May 12–14
- In camp at Falmouth May 12–25
- Depart Falmouth for Alexandria, rerouted to join McDowell at Manassas Junction May 25
- Milford July 2
- Winchester July 3
- Sperryville July 5
- Regiment scouting on the Rappahannock during July
- Reconnaissance to James City July 22–24.
- Slaughter House August 7.
- Robinson River August 8.
- Battle of Cedar Mountain August 9
- Pope's Campaign in Northern Virginia August 16 – September 2.
- Stevensburg, Raccoon Ford and Brandy Station August 20
- Beverly Ford August 20. Fords of the Rappahannock August 21–23
- Rappahannock Station August 24–25
- Sulphur Springs August 27
- Thoroughfare Gap August 28
- Groveton August 29
- Bull Run August 30
- Mountsville, Centerville, Chantilly, and Germantown August 31
- Chantilly September 1
- Frederick, Md., September 7 and 12.
- South Mountain September 14. Antietam September 16–17
- At Frederick, Md., till November 2
- Manassas Junction October 24
- Middleburg October 30
- Aldie October 31
- Salem, New Baltimore and near Warrenton November 4
- Rappahannock Station November 7–9
- Battle of Fredericksburg December 12–15
- In camp at Falmouth December 15–28
- Dumfries December 28

==== 1863 ====
- Falmouth January 1–19
- "Mud March" January 20 – 24
- Falmouth January 25 - April 13
- Rappahannock Bridge April 14
- Stoneman's Raid April 29 – May 8
- Kelly's Ford April 29
- Louisa Court House May 1–2
- South Anna Bridge near Ashland May 3
- Bealton May 10
- Operations on Northern Neck May 20–26 (Detachment)
- Brandy Station and Beverly Ford June 9
- Aldie June 17
- Middleburg June 18–19
- Upperville June 21
- Hanover, Pa., June 30
- Battle of Gettysburg, Pa., July 1–3
- Steven's Furnace July 5
- Hagerstown July 11
- Funkstown, Md., July 12
- Shephardstown and near Harper's Ferry July 14
- Halltown and Charlestown July 15
- Shephardstown July 16
- Little Washington August 5
- Beverly Ford August 15
- Brandy Station September 6
- Advance from the Rappahannock to the Rapidan September 13–17
- Culpeper Court House September 13
- Hazel River September 13
- Raccoon Ford September 14
- Culpeper September 20
- White's Ford September 21–22
- Bristoe Campaign October 9–22
- Gaines' Cross Roads October 12
- Warrenton or White Sulphur Springs October 12–13
- Auburn and Bristoe October 14
- St. Stephen's Church October 14
- Blackburn's Ford October 15
- Culpeper October 20
- Near Bealton October 22
- Rappahannock Crossing October 22
- Rappahannock Station October 23
- Advance to line of the Rappahannock November 7–8
- Mine Run Campaign November 26 – December 2
- Morton's Ford November 26
- New Hope Church November 27
- Parker's Store November 29
- Expedition to Luray December 21–23

==== 1864 ====
- Reconnaissance to Front Royal January 1–4
- Near Salem January 3 (Detachment)
- Kilpatrick's Raid to Richmond February 28 – March 4
- Beaver Dam Station February 29
- Fortifications of Richmond March 1
- Brook's Turnpike March 1
- Old Church March 2
- Near Tunstall Station March 2
- Overland Campaign May 3 – June 15
- Battle of Todd's Tavern May 5–6
- Battle of the Wilderness May 6–7
- Todd's Tavern May 7–8
- Sheridan's Raid May 9–24
- Battle of North Anna River May 9–10
- Battle of Ground Squirrel Church and Yellow Tavern May 11
- Diamond Hill May 11
- Brook Church or Fortifications of Richmond May 12
- Battle of Meadow Bridge May 12
- Battle of Jones' Bridge May 17
- Haxall's Landing May 18
- Milford May 20
- Haw's Shop May 28
- Battle of Old Church May 29–30
- Battle of Cold Harbor May 31 – June 1
- About Cold Harbor June 1–7
- Sumner's Upper Bridge and McGee's Mills June 2
- Sheridan's Trevillian Raid June 7–24
- Elliott's Mills June 8
- Trevillian Station June 11–12
- Black Creek, Tunstall Station, June 21
- White House, St. Peter's Church, June 21
- St. Mary's Church June 24
- Second Swamp June 28
- Siege operations against Petersburg and Richmond June 1864, to April 1865
- Warwick Swamp and Lee's Mill July 12
- Deep Bottom July 27–28
- New Market July 28
- Malvern Hill July 29
- Lee's Mills July 30
- Near Sycamore Church August 9
- Gravel Hill August 14
- Strawberry Plains August 14–18
- Deep Run August 16
- Nelson's Farm August 18
- Ream's Station August 23–25
- Dinwiddie Road near Ream's Station August 23
- Yellow Tavern September 2
- Stony Creek Station September 15
- Belcher's Mills September 17
- Lee's Mills September 18
- Vaughan Road September 26
- Wyatt's Farm September 29
- Poplar Springs Church September 29 – October 1
- Vaughan and Duncan Road October 1
- Boydton Plank Road or Hatcher's Run October 27–28
- Old members mustered out November 4, 1864
- Stony Creek Station December 1
- Bellefield Raid December 7–11
- Bellefield December 9–10

==== 1865 ====
- Dabney's Mills, Hatcher's Run, February 5–7
- Appomattox Campaign March 28 – April 9
- Dinwiddle Court House March 30–31
- Five Forks April 1
- Namozine Church and Jettersville April 3
- Fame's Cross Roads and Amelia Springs April 5
- Sailor's Creek and Deatonville Road April 6
- Briery Creek and Farmville April 7
- Appomattox Station April 8
- Appomattox Court House April 9
- Surrender of Lee and his army
- Duty at Petersburg and in the Dept. of Virginia April 10 – July 24
- Transit to Augusta, Maine July 24–31
- Mustered out August 1, 1865

=== Casualties ===
This regiment had the greatest number killed in action of any cavalry regiment in the entire army: 15 officers and 159 enlisted men were killed and mortally wounded; 3 officers and 341 enlisted men died of disease, a total of 518. The regiment also suffered 447 men wounded, and 612 (246 having been 1st DC Cavalry prior to their absorption into the 1st Maine) were captured by rebel forces, of whom 165 died of disease in prison.

== Armament, equipment, and uniform ==
=== Armament ===
Troopers in the 1st Maine were initially armed only with a Model 1860 Light Cavalry Saber and two Colt .44 "Army" pistols or Colt .36 "Navy" pistols. Some of the officers and senior NCOs received the Model 1840 Cavalry Saber. They were also issued ten Sharps Carbines per company. They continued with this as standard armament, although a few officers and men privately purchased Burnside, Merrill, Sharps, and Smith carbines. (Note: Many individuals in the regiment privately purchased a third revolver in the Army (.44) caliber. If they could not obtain a Colt, they bought a Remington Model 1858, a Colt Model 1848, or a Colt Walker M1847 revolver) In February 1863, the 1st and the rest of the 1st Brigade of the 3rd Division of the Army of the Potomac's Cavalry Corps were completely armed with carbines (while retaining sabers and their brace of pistols). The 1st drew single-shot Burnside breech-loading carbines that used a metallic cartridge which, as stated above, they found to be an asset when fording waterway. (Note: The Sharps carbines used a coated linen cartridge with a paper base which was sheared open with the closing action of the breech. They were issued in small waterproof ten round boxes. While the linen cartridges were more water resistant than paper cartridges, the linen and the powder inside could still get wet and unusable with immersion. This remained a problem until Sharps began using copper and brass cartridges; copper being the more common as it was cheaper. The Burnside cartridge was a conical brass cartridge with a tiny hole in the base for the flame from the separate musket cap to reach the powder. The brass could also be reloaded many times in the field with no complicated tools. Even though the Burnside cartridge was not waterproof like the later Spencers, it was still a further improvement.) A handful of individuals kept their Sharps if they were modified to accept metal cartridges, or if they were the newer models that used metallic cartridges. On September 10, 1864, all Burnside and Sharps carbines were turned in and the regiment was issued new Spencer carbines. The men from the 1st DC Cavalry had brought enough Henrys with them when they joined to arm four companies in one battalion. From that point to the end of hostilities one battalion was armed with sixteen-shot Henry rifles and two battalions were armed with seven-shot Spencers. The regiment reported the following surveys:

Fredericksburg

- A — 26 Burnside Carbines, (.54 Cal.); 45 Colt Army Model 1848 & 1860, (.44 Cal.); 42 Model 1840 Cavalry Saber
- D — 24 Burnside Carbines, (.54 Cal.); 12 Sharps Carbines, (.52 Cal.); 78 Colt Navy Model 1860, (.36 Cal.); Model 1840 Cavalry Saber
- F — 12 Burnside Carbines, (.54 Cal.); 75 Colt Navy Model 1861, (.36 Cal.); 59 Model 1840 Cavalry Saber
- G — 9 Burnside Carbines, (.54 Cal.); 47 Colt Navy Model 1861, (.36 Cal.); 44 Model 1840 Cavalry Saber
- H — 1 Burnside Carbines, (.54 Cal.); 70 Colt Navy Model 1861, (.36 Cal.); 66 Model 1840 Cavalry Saber
- I — 9 Burnside Carbines, (.54 Cal.); 81 Colt Army Model 1848 & 1860, (.44 Cal.); 84 Model 1860 Light Cavalry Saber
- L — 12 Burnside Carbines, (.54 Cal.); 86 Colt Army Model 1848 & 1860, (.44 Cal.); 80 Model 1840 Cavalry Saber
- M — 22 Burnside Carbines, (.54 Cal.); 54 Colt Army Model 1848 & 1860, (.44 Cal.); 68 Model 1860 Light Cavalry Saber
- Companies B, C, E, and K missing quarterly ordnance reports

Chancellorsville

- A — 23 Burnside Carbines, (.54 Cal.); 16 Sharps Carbines, (.52 Cal.); 48 Colt Army Model 1848 & 1860, (.44 Cal.); 42 Model 1840 Cavalry Saber
- B — 39 Sharps Carbines, (.52 Cal.); 55 Colt Army Model 1848 & 1860, (.44 Cal.); 45 Model 1840 Cavalry Saber
- E — 1 Burnside Carbines, (.54 Cal.); 39 Sharps Carbines, (.52 Cal.); 62 Colt Army Model 1848 & 1860, (.44 Cal.); 54 Model 1840 Cavalry Saber
- G — 9 Burnside Carbines, (.54 Cal.); 30 Sharps Carbines, (.52 Cal.); 59 Colt Army Model 1848 & 1860, (.44 Cal.); 50 Model 1840 Cavalry Saber
- H — 41 Burnside Carbines, (.54 Cal.); 69 Colt Army Model 1848 & 1860, (.44 Cal.); 64 Model 1840 Cavalry Saber
- I — 9 Burnside Carbines, (.54 Cal.); 20 Sharps Carbines, (.52 Cal.); 78 Colt Army Model 1848 & 1860, (.44 Cal.); 84 Model 1860 Light Cavalry Saber
- L — 12 Burnside Carbines, (.54 Cal.); 84 Colt Army Model 1848 & 1860, (.44 Cal.); 80 Model 1840 Cavalry Saber
- M — 22 Burnside Carbines, (.54 Cal.); 54 Colt Army Model 1848 & 1860, (.44 Cal.); 68 Model 1860 Light Cavalry Saber
- Companies C, D, F, and K missing quarterly ordnance reports

Survey for Second Quarter, 30 June 1864

- A — 9 Burnside Carbines, (.54 Cal.); 19 Sharps Carbines, (.52 Cal.); 18 Colt Army Model 1848 & 1860, (.44 Cal.); 7 Remington Model 1858, (.44 Cal.); 28 Model 1840 Cavalry Saber
- B — 39 Sharps Carbines, (.52 Cal.); 20 Colt Army Model 1848 & 1860, (.44 Cal.); 19 Remington Model 1858, (.44 Cal.); 45 Model 1840 Cavalry Saber
- C — 6 Burnside Carbines, (.54 Cal.); 15 Sharps Carbines, (.52 Cal.); 20 Colt Army Model 1848 & 1860, (.44 Cal.); 15 Remington Model 1858, (.44 Cal.); 45 Model 1860 Light Cavalry Saber
- D — 5 Burnside Carbines, (.54 Cal.); 30 Sharps Carbines, (.52 Cal.); 29 Colt Army Model 1848 & 1860, (.44 Cal.); 12 Remington Model 1858, (.44 Cal.); 58 Model 1840 Cavalry Saber
- E — 1 Burnside Carbines, (.54 Cal.); 39 Sharps Carbines, (.52 Cal.); 62 Colt Army Model 1848 & 1860, (.44 Cal.); 54 Model 1840 Cavalry Saber
- F — 15 Burnside Carbines, (.54 Cal.); 12 Sharps Carbines, (.52 Cal.); 19 Colt Army Model 1848 & 1860, (.44 Cal.); 18 Remington Model 1858, (.44 Cal.); 27 Model 1860 Light Cavalry Saber
- G — 9 Burnside Carbines, (.54 Cal.); 30 Sharps Carbines, (.52 Cal.); 59 Colt Army Model 1848 & 1860, (.44 Cal.); 50 Model 1840 Cavalry Saber
- H — 8 Burnside Carbines, (.54 Cal.); 24 Sharps Carbines, (.52 Cal.); 19 Colt Army Model 1848 & 1860, (.44 Cal.); 18 Remington Model 1858, (.44 Cal.); 28 Model 1860 Light Cavalry Saber
- I — 18 Burnside Carbines, (.54 Cal.); 9 Sharps Carbines, (.52 Cal.); 78 Colt Army Model 1848 & 1860, (.44 Cal.); 47 Model 1840 Cavalry Saber
- K — 25 Burnside Carbines, (.54 Cal.); 24 Sharps Carbines, (.52 Cal.); 19 Colt Army Model 1848 & 1860, (.44 Cal.); 3 Remington Model 1858, (.44 Cal.); 23 Model 1840 Cavalry Saber
- L — 12 Burnside Carbines, (.54 Cal.); 31 Sharps Carbines, (.52 Cal.); 14 Colt Army Model 1848 & 1860, (.44 Cal.); 16 Remington Model 1858, (.44 Cal.); 56 Model 1840 Cavalry Saber
- M — 22 Burnside Carbines, (.54 Cal.); 32 Sharps Carbines, (.52 Cal.); 54 Colt Army Model 1848 & 1860, (.44 Cal.); 20 Remington Model 1858, (.44 Cal.); 56 Model 1860 Light Cavalry Saber

Survey for Third Quarter, 30 September 1864

- A — 3 Burnside Carbines, (.54 Cal.); 20 Sharps Carbines, (.52 Cal.); 16 Colt Army Model 1848 & 1860, (.44 Cal.); 7 Remington Model 1858, (.44 Cal.); 1 Starr Army Model 1863, (.44 Cal.); 19 Model 1840 Cavalry Saber
- B — 2 Sharps Carbines, (.52 Cal.); 14 Colt Army Model 1848 & 1860, (.44 Cal.); 17 Remington Model 1858, (.44 Cal.); 21 Model 1860 Light Cavalry Saber
- C — 6 Burnside Carbines, (.54 Cal.); 29 Sharps Carbines, (.52 Cal.); 11 Colt Army Model 1848 & 1860, (.44 Cal.); 17 Remington Model 1858, (.44 Cal.); 42 Model 1860 Light Cavalry Saber
- D — 8 Henry Rifles (.45 Cal); 1 Burnside Carbines, (.54 Cal.); 20 Sharps Carbines, (.52 Cal.); 12 Colt Army Model 1848 & 1860, (.44 Cal.); 12 Remington Model 1858, (.44 Cal.); 34 Model 1840 Cavalry Saber
- E — 9 Sharps Carbines, (.52 Cal.); 15 Colt Army Model 1848 & 1860, (.44 Cal.); 11 Remington Model 1858, (.44 Cal.); 17 Model 1840 Cavalry Saber
- F — 8 Burnside Carbines, (.54 Cal.); 12 Sharps Carbines, (.52 Cal.); 7 Colt Army Model 1848 & 1860, (.44 Cal.); 22 Remington Model 1858, (.44 Cal.); 1 Starr Army Model 1863, (.44 Cal.); 18 Model 1860 Light Cavalry Saber
- G — 5 Burnside Carbines, (.54 Cal.); 2 Spencer Carbines (.52 Cal.); 30 Sharps Carbines, (.52 Cal.); 20 Colt Army Model 1848 & 1860, (.44 Cal.); 3 Remington Model 1858, (.44 Cal.); 31 Model 1860 Light Cavalry Saber
- H — 8 Henry Rifles (.45 Cal); 24 Sharps Carbines, (.52 Cal.); 42 Colt Army Model 1848 & 1860, (.44 Cal.); 4 Remington Model 1858, (.44 Cal.); 34 Model 1860 Light Cavalry Saber
- I — 6 Henry Rifles (.45 Cal); 14 Burnside Carbines, (.54 Cal.); 13 Sharps Carbines, (.52 Cal.); 10 Colt Army Model 1848 & 1860, (.44 Cal.); 26 Remington Model 1858, (.44 Cal.); 1 Starr Army Model 1863, (.44 Cal.); 51 Model 1860 Light Cavalry Saber
- K — 14 Henry Rifles (.45 Cal); 22 Burnside Carbines, (.54 Cal.); 2 Sharps Carbines, (.52 Cal.); 19 Colt Army Model 1848 & 1860, (.44 Cal.); 14 Remington Model 1858, (.44 Cal.); 3 Starr Army Model 1863, (.44 Cal.); 36 Model 1840 Cavalry Saber
- L — 10 Henry Rifles (.45 Cal); 5 Burnside Carbines, (.54 Cal.); 12 Sharps Carbines, (.52 Cal.); 18 Colt Army Model 1848 & 1860, (.44 Cal.); 18 Remington Model 1858, (.44 Cal.); 15 Model 1840 Cavalry Saber; 21 Model 1860 Light Cavalry Saber
- M — 6 Henry Rifles (.45 Cal); 16 Burnside Carbines, (.54 Cal.); 24 Sharps Carbines, (.52 Cal.); 3 Colt Army Model 1848 & 1860, (.44 Cal.); 1 Remington Model 1858, (.44 Cal.); 4 Starr Army Model 1863, (.44 Cal.); 37 Model 1840 Cavalry Saber

==== Sabers ====
Issued weapons

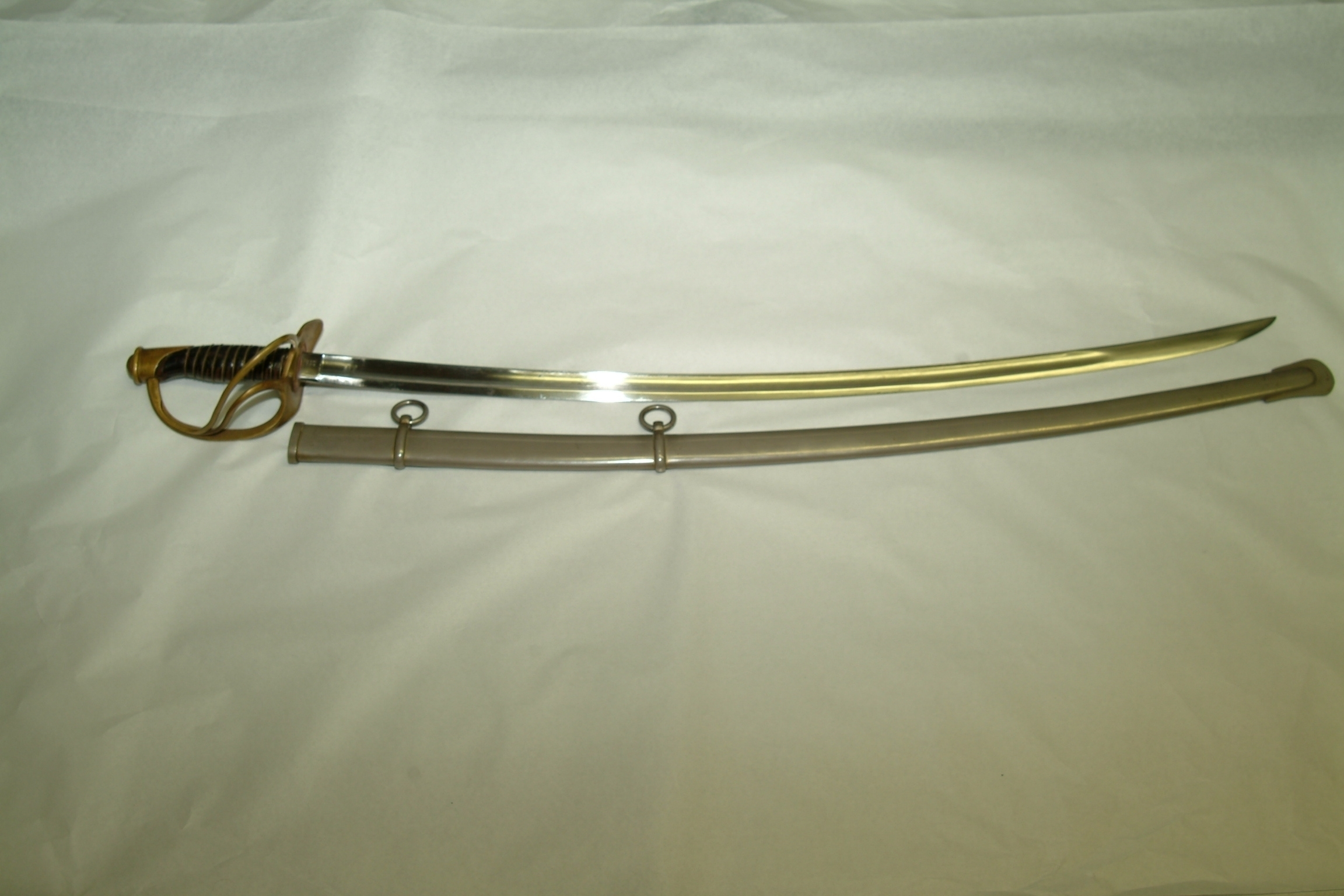
Model 1860 Light Cavalry Saber

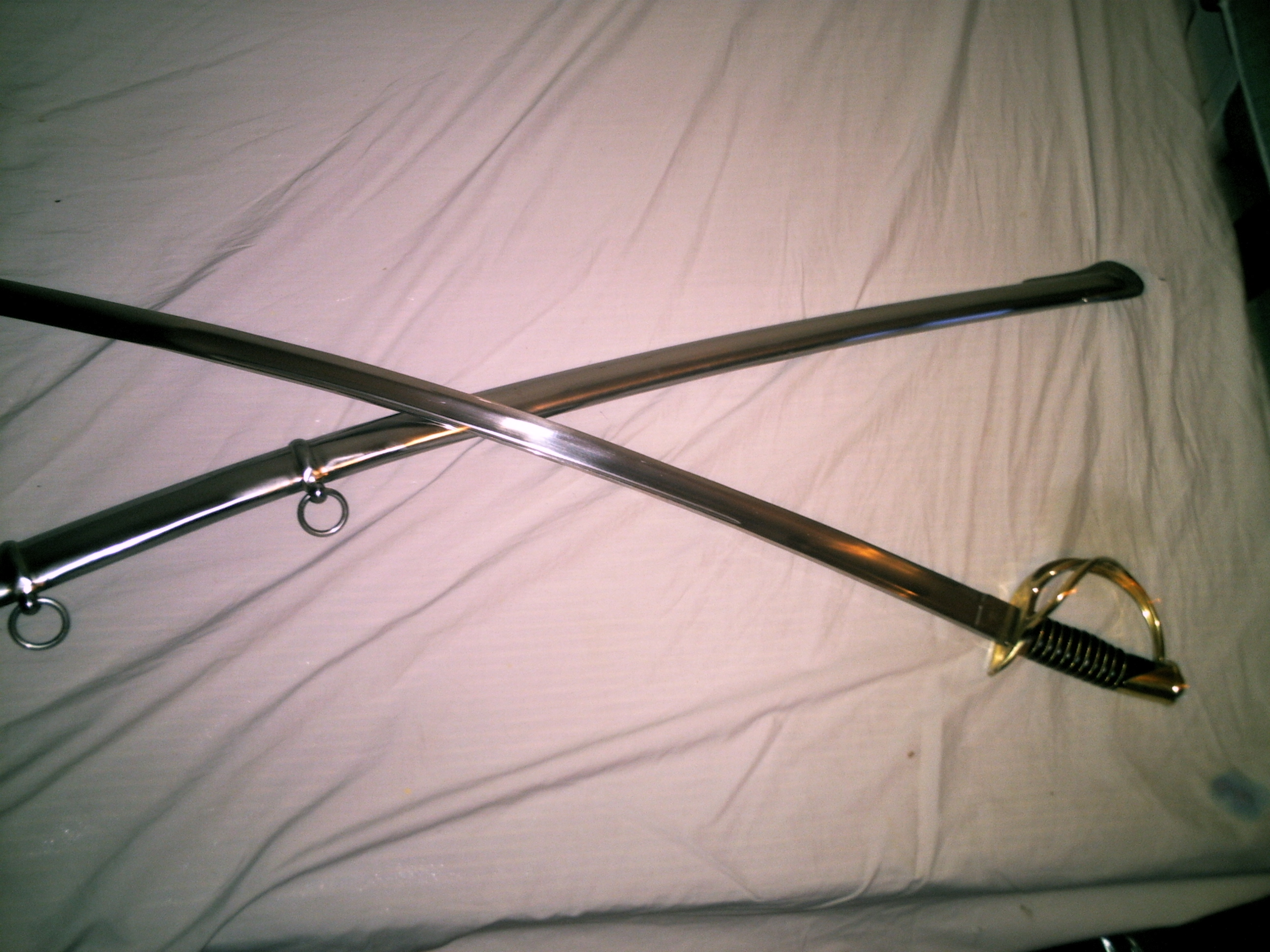
"Old Wristbreaker," Model 1840 Cavalry Saber

==== Pistols ====
Issued weapons

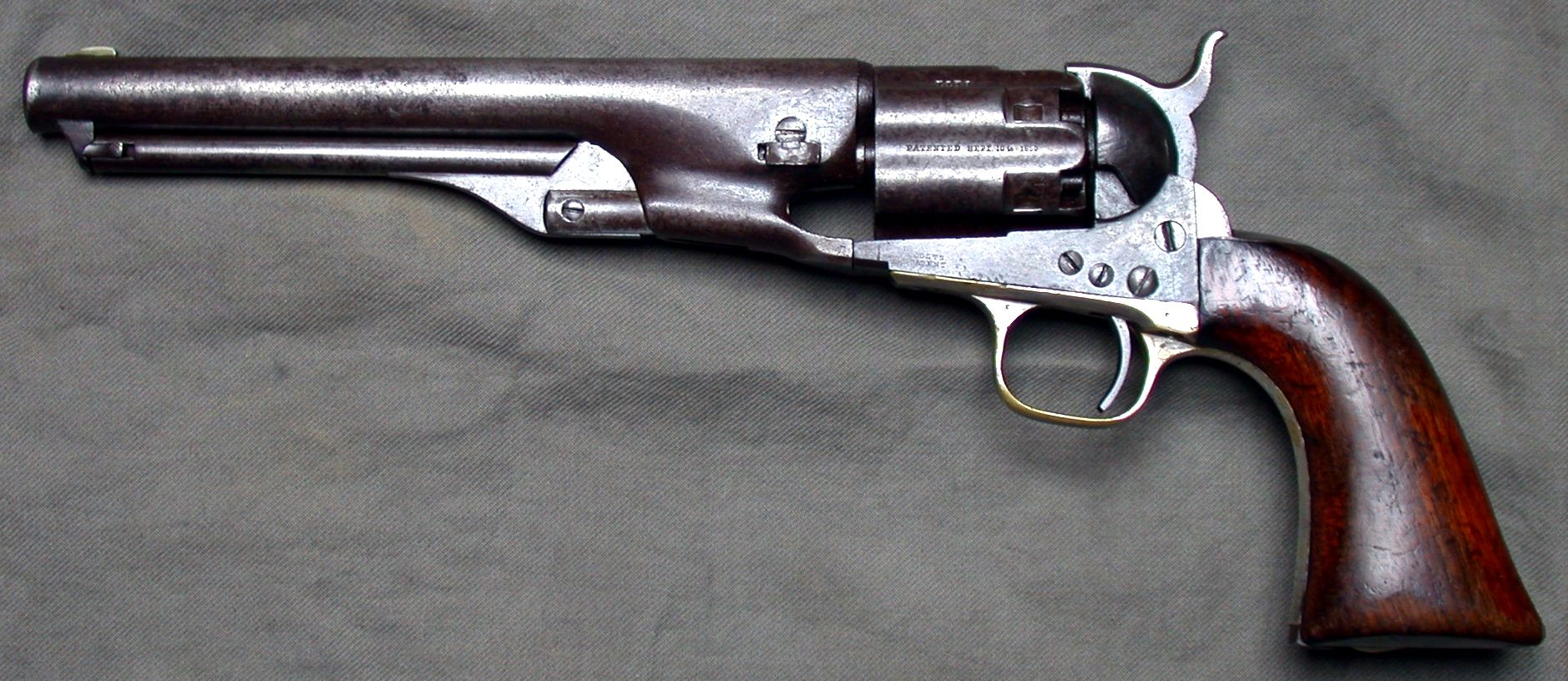
Colt Army 1860

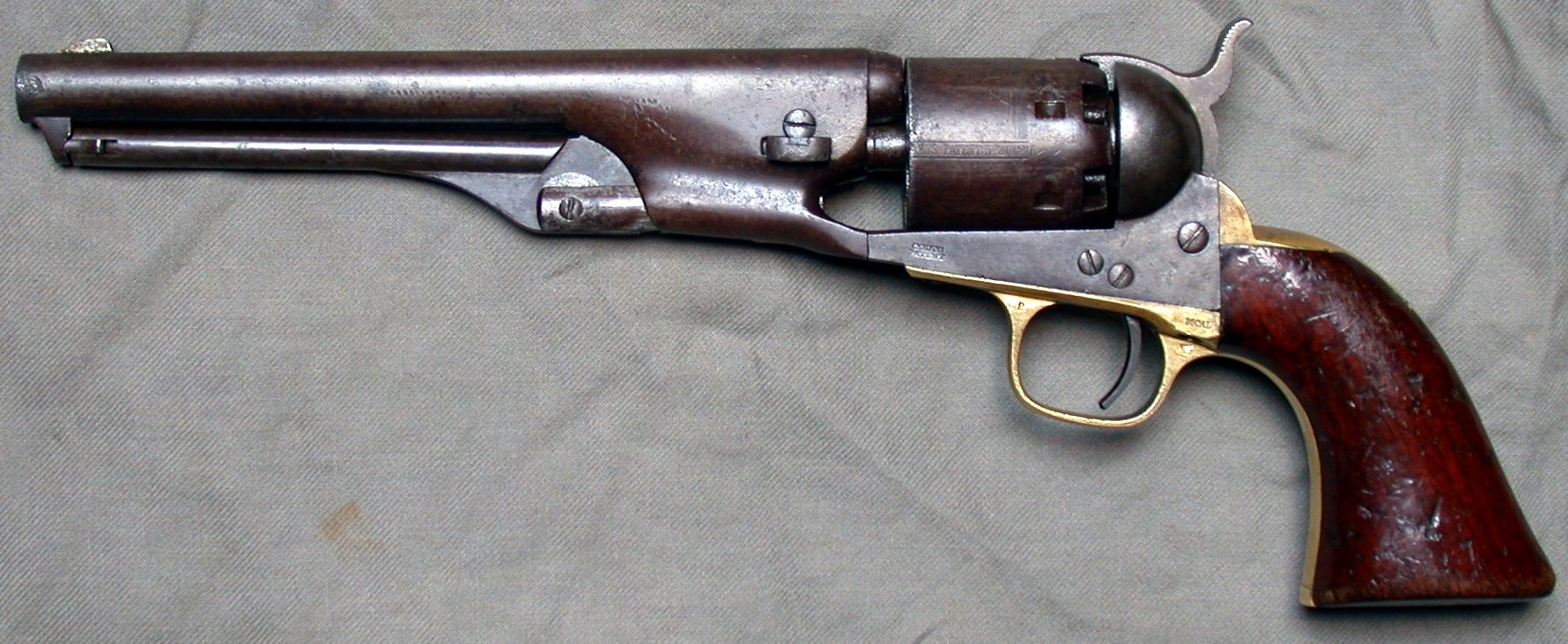
Colt Model 1861 Navy

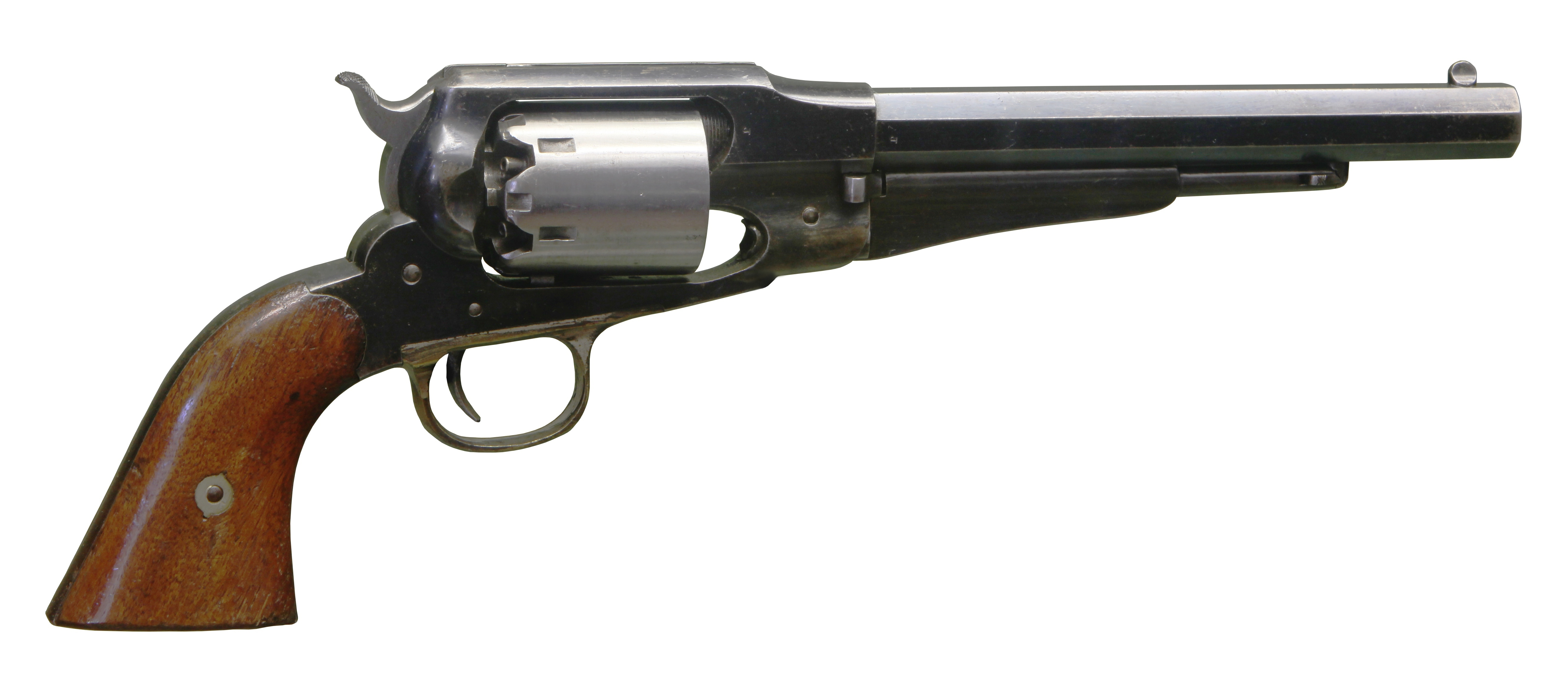
Remington New Model 1858 .44 "Army" pistol

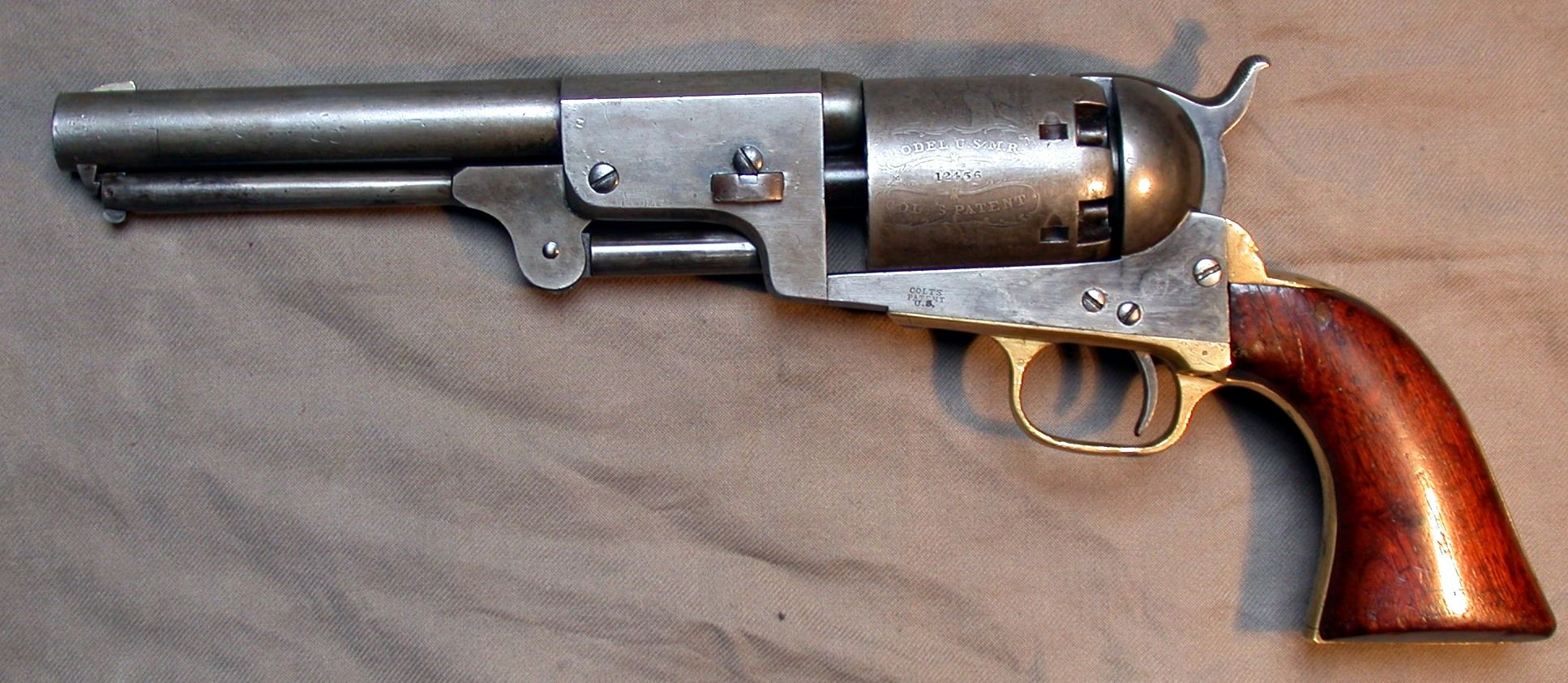
Colt Model 1848

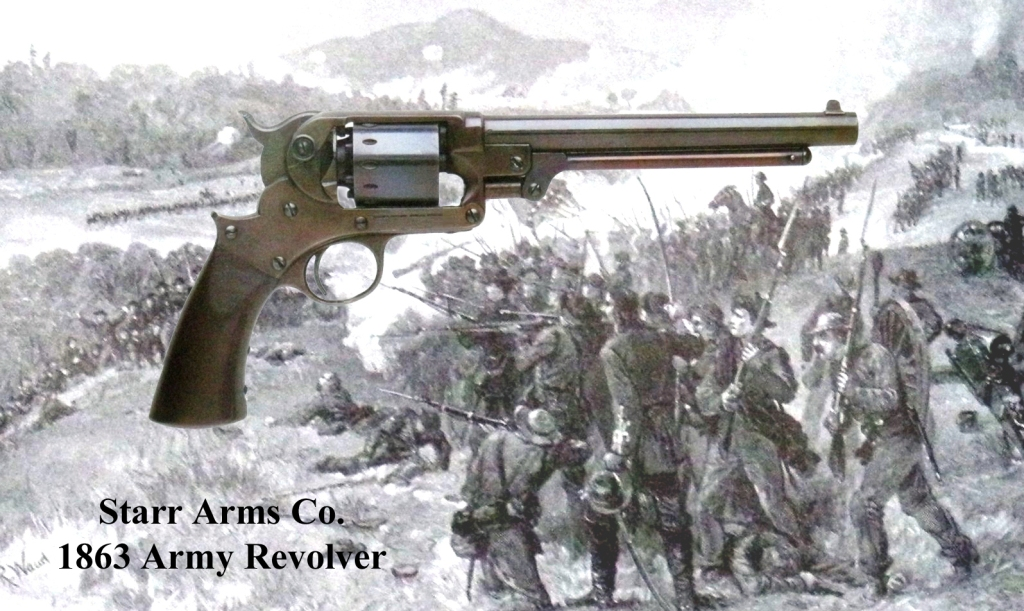
Starr M1863 .44 Single Action Revolver
Privately purchased weapons mentioned in histories and memoirs

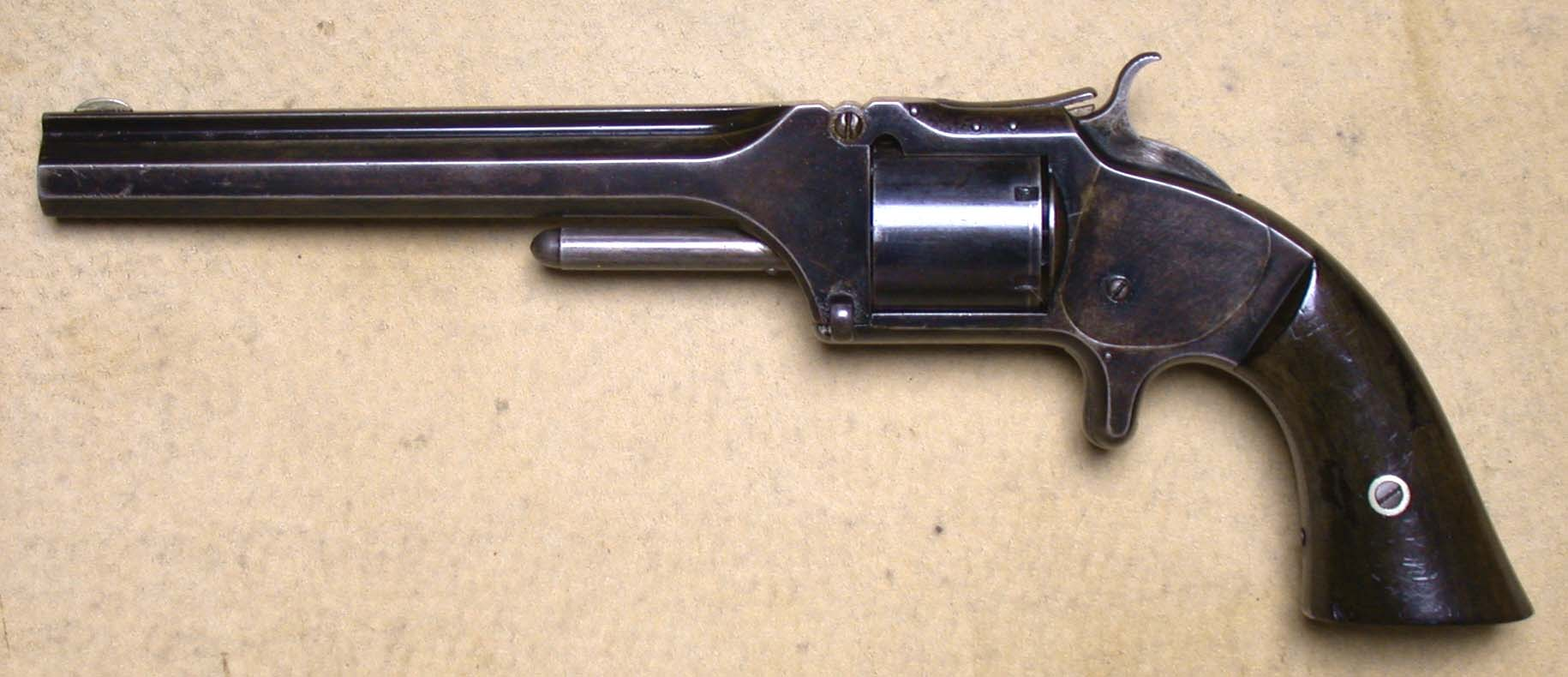
Smith & Wesson Model No. 2 Army

==== Carbines ====
Issued weapons

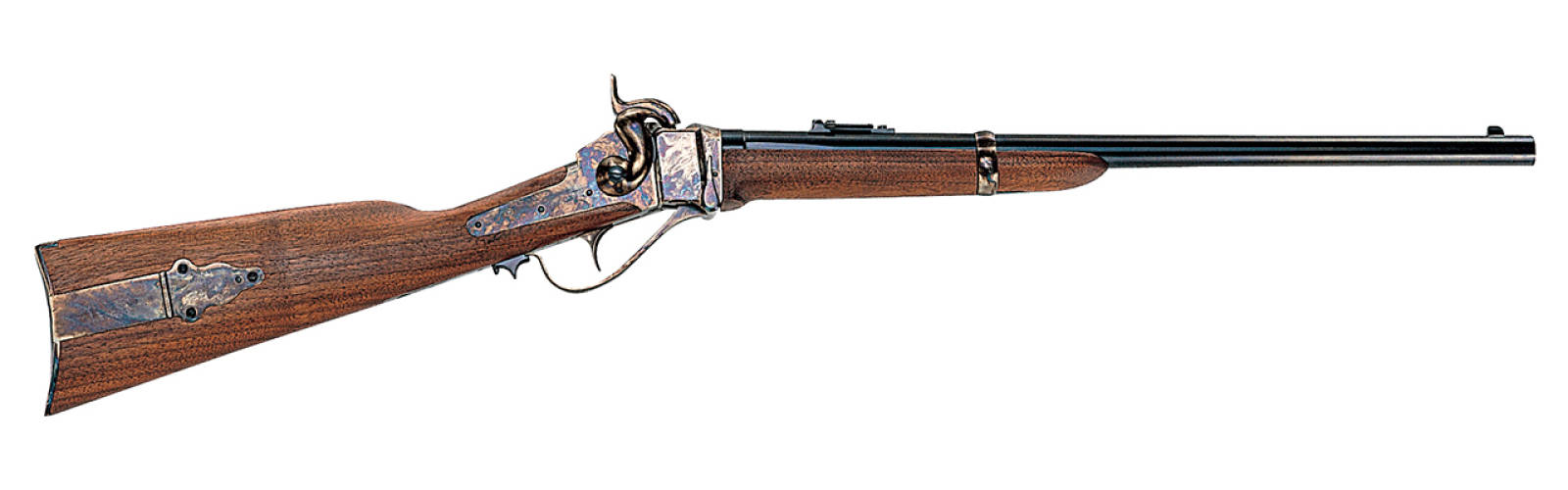
Sharps carbine

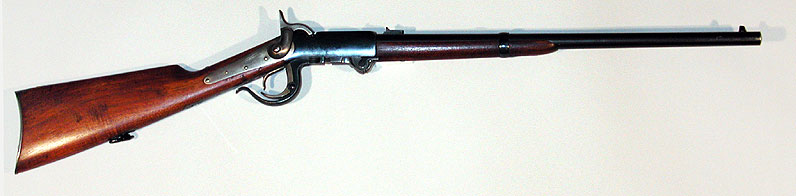
Burnside carbine

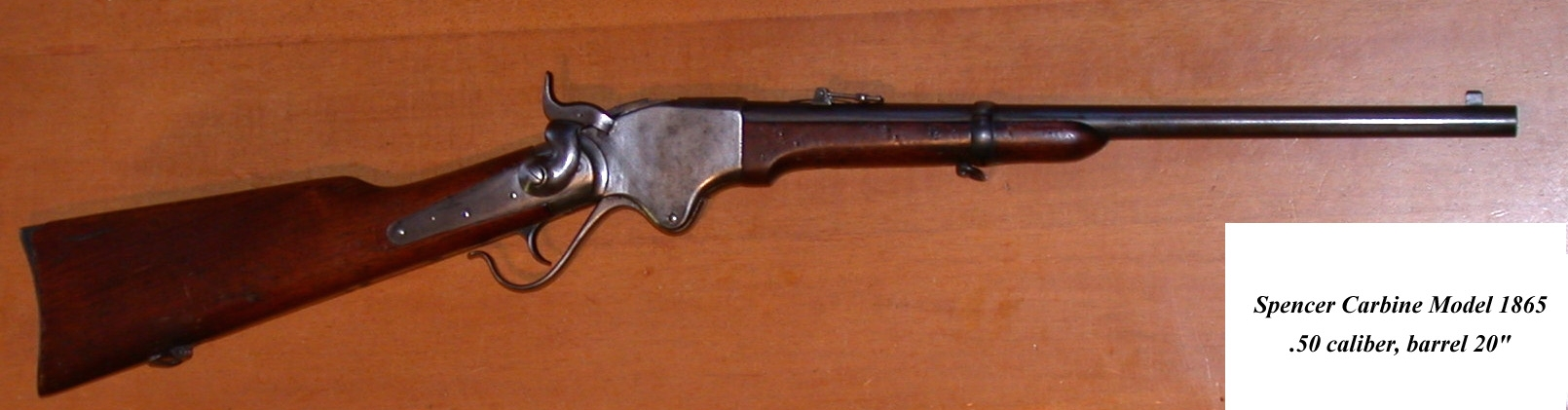
Spencer seven-shot carbine, issued weapon

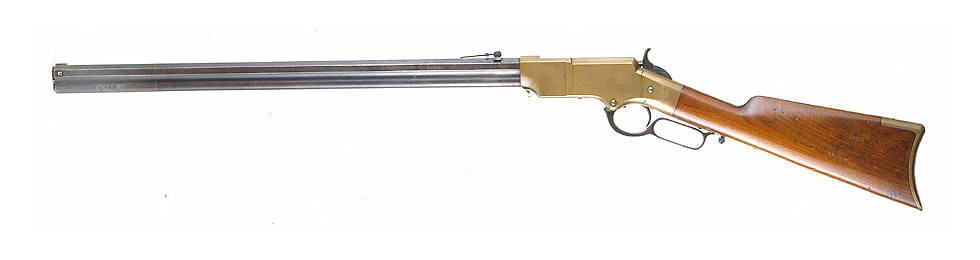
Henry sixteen-shot rifle, issued weapon
Privately purchased weapons mentioned in histories and memoirs

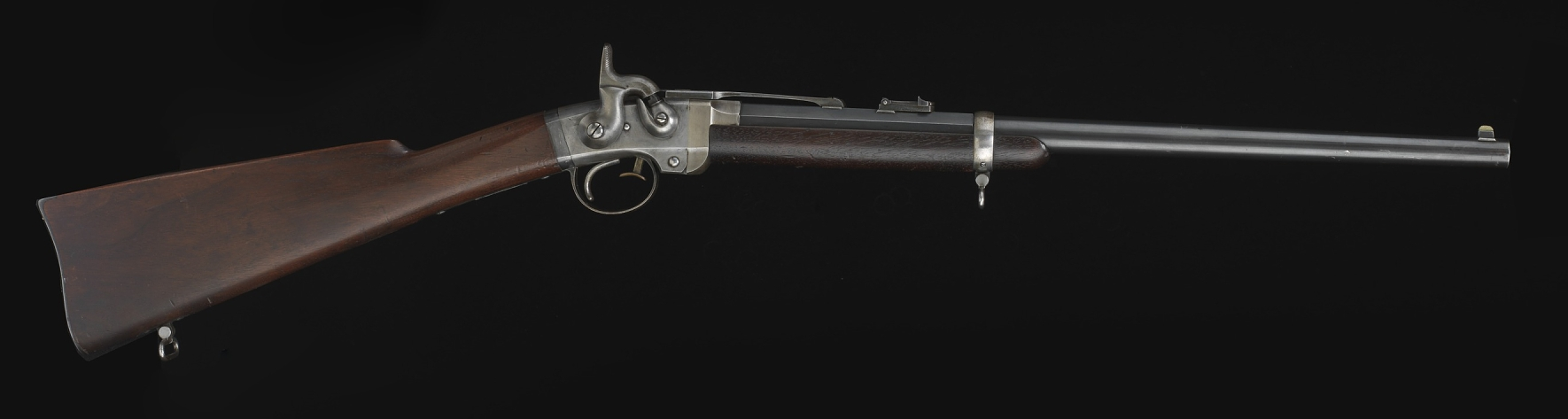
Smith 0.50 caliber breech-loading carbine.

=== Equipment and tack ===
The 1st Maine Cavalry used standard McClellan saddle and tack. Like many other volunteer cavalry regiments, the 1st Maine obtained breast straps for all mounts while some troopers were issued crupper straps and martingales as well.

=== Uniform ===
The men of the regiment were issued their initial uniforms as they became available during training in Augusta. They were issued dark blue Cavalry shell jackets, sky blue cavalry trousers (with reinforced seat), and the sky blue Cavalry winter overcoat (with a shorter cape than the infantry version). From photographs in the regimental history, the Hardee hat and slouch hat seemed to be more common than the kepi, or forage cap, among the regiment.

== Notable personnel ==
- Daniel W. Ames, future state legislator
- Jonathan Prince Cilley, ended the war a Brigadier General, was the son of Maine Congressman Jonathan Cilley, (Note: He was a member of Bowdoin's famed class of 1825, which included Nathaniel Hawthorne and Henry Wadsworth Longfellow. While at Bowdoin, Cilley also became close friends with future U.S. President Franklin Pierce, a member of the class of 1824. Deciding to stay in Maine after graduating from Bowdoin, Cilley studied law with John Ruggles, was admitted to the bar in 1828, and practiced in Thomaston. He served part of one term in the 25th Congress, and died as the result of a wound sustained in a duel with another Congressman, William J. Graves of Kentucky.) great grandson of Major General Joseph Cilley, and nephew of Joseph Cilley
- Ansel Drew, Corporal, Company A, captured battle flag of Hampton's Brigade t Brandy Station
- Llewellyn Garrish Estes, U.S. Medal of Honor winner
- Charles H. Smith, U.S. Medal of Honor winner
- Sidney W. Thaxter, U.S. Medal of Honor winner
- Edward Parsons Tobie, Jr., U.S. Medal of Honor winner

== Monuments and memorials ==
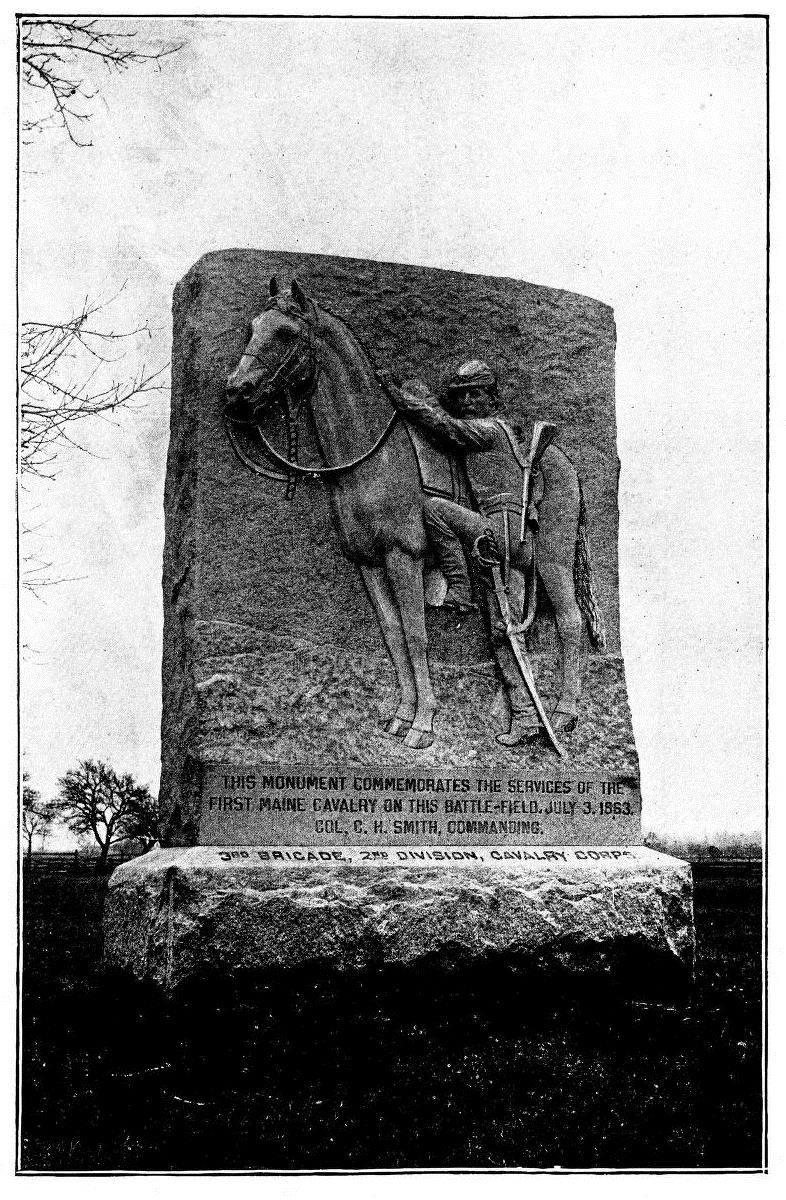
1st Maine Volunteer Cavalry's monument, Gettysburg National Battlefield, 1898.

During the 1880s, planning was undertaken to erect a monument on the Gettysburg National Battlefield which would honor the 1863 service of the 1st Maine Volunteer Cavalry at Gettysburg. That monument was subsequently dedicated in a formal ceremony held at the battlefield on October 3, 1889.

== See also ==
- List of Maine Civil War units
- Maine in the American Civil War
- Cavalry in the American Civil War
- Army of the Potomac
- Army of the Shenandoah
