= Edward Parsons Tobie Jr. =

American journalist

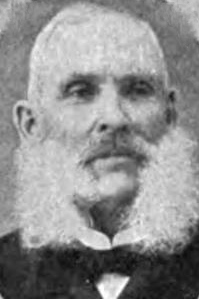
- Edward P. Tobie Jr., c. 1900
- Born: March 19, 1838; Lewiston, Maine, US
- Died: January 21, 1900 (aged 61); Rhode Island, US
- Military career
- Allegiance: United States
- Branch: US Army
- Rank: Sergeant-Major
- Unit: 1st Maine Volunteer Cavalry
- Conflicts: American Civil War: First Battle of Winchester; Battle of Cedar Mountain; Second Battle of Bull Run; Battle of South Mountain; Battle of Antietam; Battle of Fredericksburg; Stoneman's 1863 Raid; Battle of Brandy Station; Battle of Gettysburg; Battle of Mine Run; Battle of Todd's Tavern; Battle of Haw's Shop; Battle of Old Church; Battle of Cold Harbor; Battle of Trevilian Station; Battle of St. Mary's Church; First Battle of Deep Bottom/Gravel Hill; Second Battle of Ream's Station; Battle of Boydton Plank Road; Appomattox Campaign; Battle of Dinwiddie Court House; Battle of Five Forks; Battle of Sailor's Creek; Appomattox Court House
- Awards: Medal of Honor

Edward Parsons Tobie Jr. (March 19, 1838 – January 21, 1900) was a United States soldier who received his nation's highest award for bravery during combat, the U.S. Medal of Honor, while fighting with the Union Army during the American Civil War as a sergeant-major with the 1st Maine Volunteer Cavalry. According to his Medal of Honor citation, despite having been severely wounded during the Battle of Sailor's Creek, Virginia on April 6, 1865, and again at Farmville on April 7, he refused hospitalization, choosing instead to remain with his regiment in order to perform the duties of the 1st Maine's regimental adjutant who had recently fallen in combat. Those duties included services rendered by Tobie at Appomattox.

== Formative years ==
Born on March 19, 1838, in Lewiston, Maine, Edward Parsons Tobie Jr. was a son of abolitionist Edward Parsons Tobie, Sr. (1800–1875) and his first wife, Caroline (Frye) Tobie (1804–1838). His father, a wool carder by trade who ultimately became the town clerk of Lewiston, holding that job, with the exception of one year from 1839 until 1875. A deacon with Lewiston's Free Baptist Church, the elder Tobie also helped fugitive slaves escape to Canada. The other siblings in the Tobie household were: Sarah, Mary, Joseph, and Laroy/Leroy (born, respectively, in 1829, 1832, 1838, and 1843).

== Civil War ==
Following his enrollment in Maine for Civil War military service, Edward P. Tobie Jr. officially mustered in for duty as a sergeant with Company G of the 1st Maine Volunteer Cavalry. He then participated with his regiment in a number of the Union Army's most important engagements of the war, including 1862's First Battle of Winchester (May 25) and battles of Cedar Mountain (August 9), Second Bull Run (August 28–30), South Mountain (September 14), Antietam (September 17), and Fredericksburg (December 11–15); 1863's Stoneman's Raid, Battle of Brandy Station (June 9), during which he was taken prisoner after being wounded, and the battles of Gettysburg (July 1–3), and Mine Run (November 7 to December 2); and 1864's battles of Todd's Tavern (May 7), Haw's Shop (May 28), Old Church (May 30), Cold Harbor (May 31 to June 12), Trevilian Station (June 11–12), St. Mary's Church (June 24), Deep Bottom I/Gravel Hill (July 27–29), Ream's Station II (August 25), and Boydton Plank Road (October 27–28).

Tobie was then appointed as sergeant-major on December 12, 1864.

During the spring of 1865, Tobie then performed the act of valor for which he would ultimately be awarded the U.S. Medal of Honor. Despite having been severely wounded in action during the Battle of Sailor's Creek, Virginia on April 6, 1865, and again at Farmville on April 7, he refused hospitalization, choosing instead to remain with his regiment in order to perform the duties of the 1st Maine's regimental adjutant who had recently fallen in combat. Those duties included services rendered by Tobie at Appomattox. As told in Beyer's Deeds of Valor:

Lieutenant T. Little, adjutant of the First Maine Cavalry, was wounded in the first charge of General Smith's Third Brigade on the 6th, and shortly after his successor, Lieutenant J. W. Poor, met a like fate, whereupon Colonel Cilly detailed Sergeant Tobie to assume the duties of adjutant. Just as the regiment started on the final charge that day which resulted so disastrously for the enemy a bullet pierced Tobie's foot and threw him to the ground. With great difficulty he hobbled to the rear, but upon recovering his horse, which had been caught by the colonel's orderly, he mounted it and started for the field hospital, where he had his wound bandaged. The surgeon advised him to stay in the rear, but finding his wound not to be serious he rejoined his regiment, reaching it in time to go on a scout through the woods. The regiment was on the march early next day, the plucky sergeant with it, and though his foot pained him greatly he did not hesitate and stay behind when the charge into the village of Farmville was made. He rode at the front of the second battalion with Major Hall, and dashing through the village put to rout a superior force of the enemy. In this charge Sergeant Tobie was again wounded, the bullet passing through his leg, killing his horse; but upon finding that the wound was not serious, he had it bandaged and a second time rejoined his regiment, having in the meantime procured another horse. That night found him with his regiment on its march to Appomattox, where for a third time he was, in a wounded condition, engaged with the enemy.

In addition to his Medal of Honor award, Tobie's valor was also recognized via a good conduct mention in the Appomattox battle report filed by his superior officer. On May 8, 1865, Tobie was then commissioned as a second lieutenant with Company E of the 1st Maine Volunteer Cavalry.

With the war over and Reconstruction beginning, he returned home with his regiment in early August 1865.

== Post-war life ==
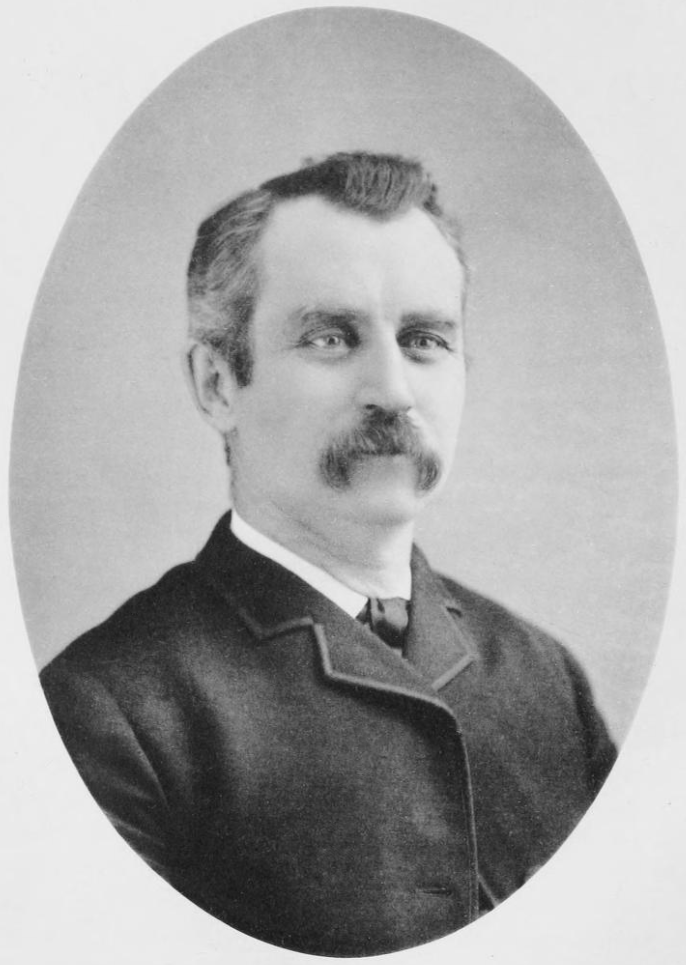
c. 1887

Following his honorable discharge from the military, Tobie returned home to New England. On September 14, 1870, he and his wife, Adeline (Phipps) Tobie, welcomed the birth of son, Edward (1870–1952). They made their home initially in Providence, Rhode Island, where he was employed as the assistant to the editor of the Providence Journal.

Sometime during the 1870s, Tobie was appointed as the historian of his former Civil War regiment, which had been reconstituted as the First Maine Cavalry Association, and charged with researching and writing that regiment's history. The result was the 1887 publication of History of the First Maine Cavalry 1861-1865.

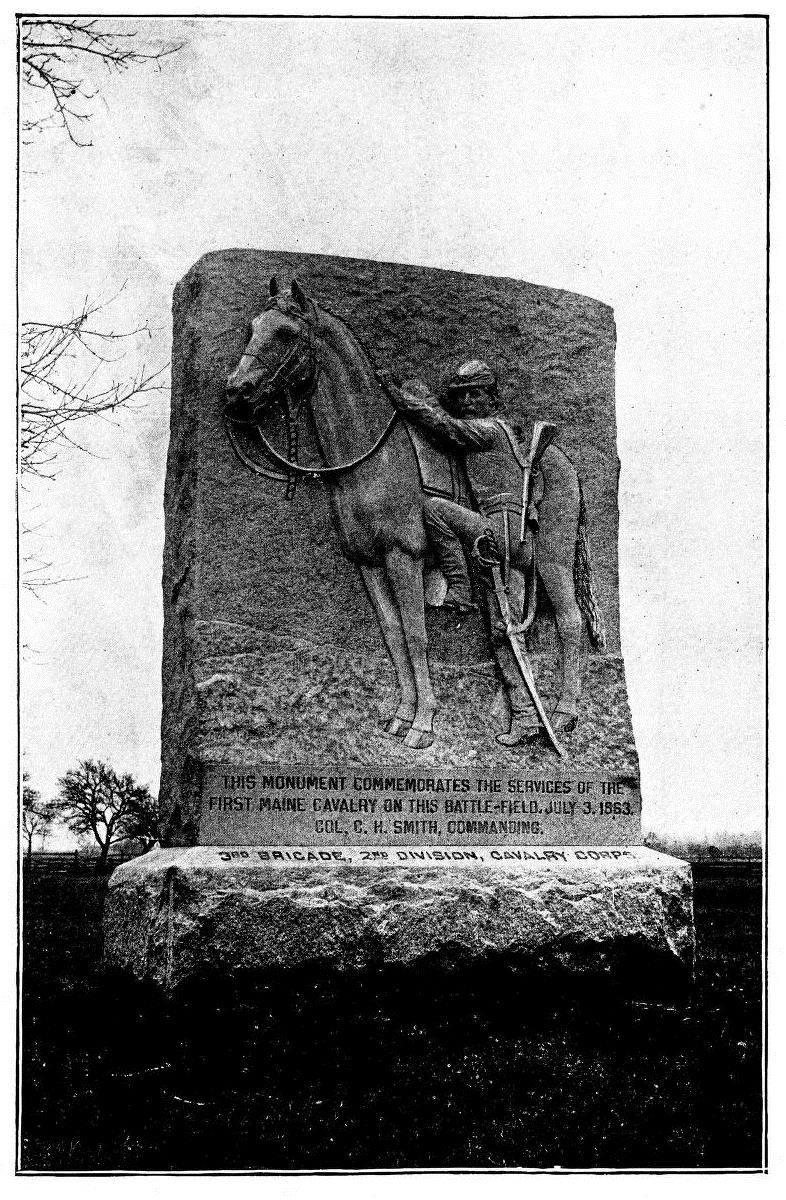
1st Maine Volunteer Cavalry's monument, Gettysburg National Battlefield, 1898

In 1889, he wrote a poem and history sketch about the 1st Maine Cavalry to celebrate the placement of a monument to his former Civil War regiment on at the Gettysburg National Battlefield. He then read both at that monument's dedication ceremony on October 3, 1889. The words of Tobie's poem heard that day were:

This sculptured soldier here,
In readiness to mount and ride
Where duty’s call or country’s need
Shall point the way, whate’er betide,
With faith unbounded in his steed,
And knowing naught of fear,

With spirit that will face
Privations such as few endure
And danger dire to life and limb,
Face death, for love of country pure,
And calmly meet his summons grim,
Face aught except disgrace;—

This sculptured soldier here
Is type of thousands, good and true,
Who, six and twenty years ago,
Stood on this field, brave boys in blue,
Stood firm against th’ invading foe—
And some lie buried near;

Not only here they stood,
But on a hundred fields of strife
They stood ‘mid storm of shot and shell
And offered life for nation’s life;
They did their duty grandly well,—
They did all soldier could.

This sculptured soldier here
Embodies all the service grand,
The days of suffering and pain,
The hardships met on every hand,
By nigh three thousand men from Maine,
The State which we revere,—

And all the weary hours
Of picket duty day and night,
The campaigns ‘neath a southern sun,
The march, the skirmish and the fight,
The battles fought, the victories won,
By these brave boys of ours,

And all the throb and ache
Of wounds received from fellow-men
And illness nothing could appease,
The dreary life in prison pen,
The death by battle and disease,—
All this for country’s sake.

This sculptured soldier here
Will tell their story through all time;
And more than that, will teach to all
Who look on him, that ‘tis sublime
To promptly answer duty’s call;
And duty make so clear,

That in the coming years
The spirit of these gallant men
Throughout the land will e’er abide,
And should our country call again,
As many more will mount and ride
With neither doubts nor fears.

In 1881, he was assigned by the editor of the Providence Journal to oversee that newspaper's Pawtucket, Rhode Island office, a position he continued to hold for nearly two more decades.

== Death and interment ==
Preceded in death by his wife, Addie, in Rhode Island on April 25, 1891, and ailing with Bright's Disease, Edward P. Tobie Jr. died shortly after the turn of the century, in Pawtucket, Rhode Island on January 21, 1900.

== Medal of Honor citation ==
Rank and organization: Sergeant Major, 1st Maine Cavalry. Place and date: At Appomattox Campaign, Va., March 29 to April 9, 1865. Entered service at: Lewiston, Maine. Birth: Lewiston, Maine. Date of issue: April 1, 1898. Citation:

The President of the United States of America, in the name of Congress, takes pleasure in presenting the Medal of Honor to Sergeant Major Edward Parsons Tobie Jr., United States Army, for extraordinary heroism on March 29–9 April 1865, while serving with 1st Maine Cavalry, in action at Appomattox Campaign, Virginia. Though severely wounded at Sailors Creek, 6 April, and at Farmville, 7 April, Sergeant Major Tobie refused to go to the hospital, but remained with his regiment, performed the full duties of adjutant upon the wounding of that officer, and was present for duty at Appomattox.

== See also ==
- List of Medal of Honor recipients
- Maine in the American Civil War

== Sources ==
- Beyer, Walter Frederick (1905). Deeds of Valor (PDF) (1st ed.). Detroit, MI: Perrien-Keydel Co. pp. 318–319. OCLC 680527243.
- Gilman, John T., ed. (August 8, 1865). "Obituary of Edward P. Tobie" (PDF). The Portland Daily Press. Portland, ME: N. A. Foster & Co.: 3. ISSN 2643-7600. OCLC 1030992867.
- Kountz, John S (March 1, 1888). "Literature - Review of History of the First Maine Cavalry" (PDF). The National Tribune. Washington, DC: The Grand Army of the Republic: 4. ISSN 2151-3937. OCLC 9186825.
- Maine Gettysburg Commission (1898). Maine at Gettysburg: Report of Maine Commissioners Prepared by the Executive Committee (PDF). Portland, ME: The Lakeside Press. p. 694. OCLC 6079300.
- Merrill, Georgia Drew, ed. (1891). History of Androscoggin County, Maine (PDF). Boston, MA: W. A. Fergusson & Co. pp. 1–879. OCLC 665072371.
- Pilsbury, Charles A., ed. (May 21, 1896). "Papers and Periodicals" (PDF). The Republican Journal. Belfast, ME: James A Merrill: 1. ISSN 0034-5075. OCLC 2266886.
- Pilsbury, Charles A., ed. (January 25, 1900). "Obituary of Edward P. Tobie" (PDF). The Republican Journal. Belfast, ME: James A Merrill: 1. ISSN 0034-5075. OCLC 2266886.
- Reid, Whitelaw (January 22, 1900). "Edward P. Tobie" (PDF). New-York Daily Tribune. Belfast, ME: Whitelaw Reid: 1. ISSN 2158-2661. OCLC 9388331.
- Tobie, Edward Parsons Jr (1887). History of the First Maine Cavalry 1861-1865 (PDF). Boston, MA: The First Maine Cavalry Association. p. 735. OCLC 02013163.
- US Census, Bureau of (January 1, 1841). 1840 US Census, Lewiston, Lincoln County, Maine. Washington, DC: US Census Bureau.
- US Census, Bureau of (January 1, 1851). 1850 US Census, Lewiston, Lincoln County, Maine. Washington, DC: US Census Bureau.
- "Edward P. Tobie Jr. - U.S. Civil War - U.S. Army - Medal of Honor Recipient". Congressional Medal of Honor Society. CMOHS. 2014.
- "Civil War (Recipients M-Z)". Medal of Honor Recipients. US Army Center of Military History. Archived from the original on August 3, 2019.
- "Edward Parsons Tobie - Recipient". The Hall of Valor Project. Sightline Media Group. 2020.
- "Edward Parsons Tobie Jnr". VCOnline. 2020.
