= John M. Vanderslice =

John Mitchell Vanderslice
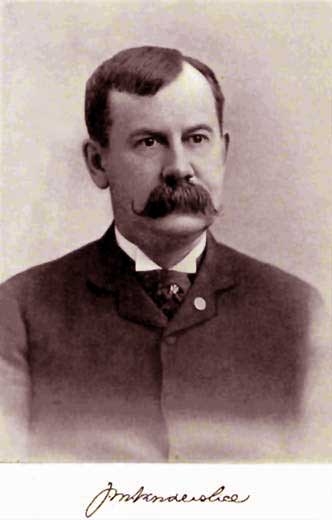
- Born: August 31, 1846; Philadelphia, Pennsylvania
- Died: March 12, 1915 (aged 68); Collegeville, Pennsylvania
- Burial place: Saint James Episcopal Church Cemetery, Collegeville, Pennsylvania
- Military career
- Allegiance: United States of America
- Branch: United States Army (Union Army)
- Units: 49th Pennsylvania Militia, Emergency of 1863 (private, Company F); 8th Pennsylvania Cavalry (private, Company D)
- Conflicts: American Civil War: Overland Campaign; Battle of the Wilderness; Battle of Todd's Tavern; Battle of Spotsylvania Court House; Battle of Yellow Tavern; Battle of Haw's Shop; Battle of Cold Harbor; Battle of Trevilian Station; Siege of Petersburg; Battle of Jerusalem Plank Road; Battle of Saint Mary's Church; First Battle of Deep Bottom; Second Battle of Ream's Station; Battle of Peebles's Farm; Battle of Hatcher's Run; Appomattox Campaign; Battle of Five Forks; Battle of Sailor's Creek; Battle of Cumberland Church
- Awards: Medal of Honor

John Mitchell Vanderslice (August 31, 1846 - March 12, 1915) was a United States soldier who fought for the Union Army during the American Civil War as a member of the 8th Pennsylvania Cavalry. He received his nation's highest award for valor, the U.S. Medal of Honor, for being the first man to reach the rifle pits of the Confederate States Army during a charge made by his regiment on CSA fortifications in the Battle of Hatcher's Run, Virginia on February 6, 1865.

A practicing lawyer post-war, he also played an active part in the Commonwealth of Pennsylvania's memorialization of its role in the Civil War, persuading his fellow members of the Grand Army of the Republic and Gettysburg Battlefield Monument Association to place a small memorial stone at Little Round Top — the first of a series of monuments to be erected at the Gettysburg National Battlefield during the late 1800s and early 1900s."

During the late 1800s, he also researched and published his book, Gettysburg Then and Now: The Field of American Valor, Where and How the Regiments Fought and the Troops They Encountered.

== Formative years ==
Born in Philadelphia, Pennsylvania on August 31, 1846, John Mitchell Vanderslice was a member of "one of the oldest families in Pennsylvania," according to historian Ellwood Roberts. He and his brothers, Thaddeus (1841–1907) and Theodore (1848–1924), were sons of Marcus Vanderslice (1813–1876), and were raised on "a farm adjoining Valley Forge Campground, and educated at the Freeland Seminary, a Mennonite preparatory school for boys which was located in Collegeville, Pennsylvania.

== Civil War ==
While still a student at the Freeland Seminary, Vanderslice responded to a call by Pennsylvania Governor Andrew Gregg Curtin for volunteers to defend the state from the threatened invasion by the Confederate States Army during the summer of 1863. After enrolling for state militia service in early July, he mustered in as a private with Company F of the 49th Pennsylvania Militia, Emergency of 1863, and was honorably discharged just over a month later when state officials declared the emergency over. His unit disbanded during the first week of September.

Less than six months later, he enlisted again — this time with a combat-hardened cavalry unit. After enrolling for service at Philadelphia on February 17, 1864, he mustered in that same day as a private with Company D of the 8th Pennsylvania Cavalry (also known as the 89th Pennsylvania Volunteers). Military records at the time described him as an 18-year-old native of Philadelphia who was employed as a clerk, and who was 5'5" tall with dark hair, blue eyes and a dark complexion.

He had joined just in time to fight with the 8th Pennsylvania Cavalry during one of the Union Army's most significant phases of duty — the Overland Campaign in Virginia commanded by Lieutenant-General Ulysses S. Grant. Beginning with the Battle of the Wilderness (May 5–7, 1864), he and his fellow cavalrymen fought continuously in a series of battles at: Todd's Tavern (May 7), Spotsylvania Court House (May 8–21), Yellow Tavern (May 11), Haw's Shop (May 28), Cold Harbor (May 31–June 12), and Trevilian Station (June 11–12) before engaging in the Siege of Petersburg (June 9, 1864 – March 25, 1865) and its battles at: Jerusalem Plank Road (June 21–23), St. Mary's Church (June 24), Deep Bottom I (July 27–29), Ream's Station II (August 25), and Poplar Springs Church (September 30–October 2).

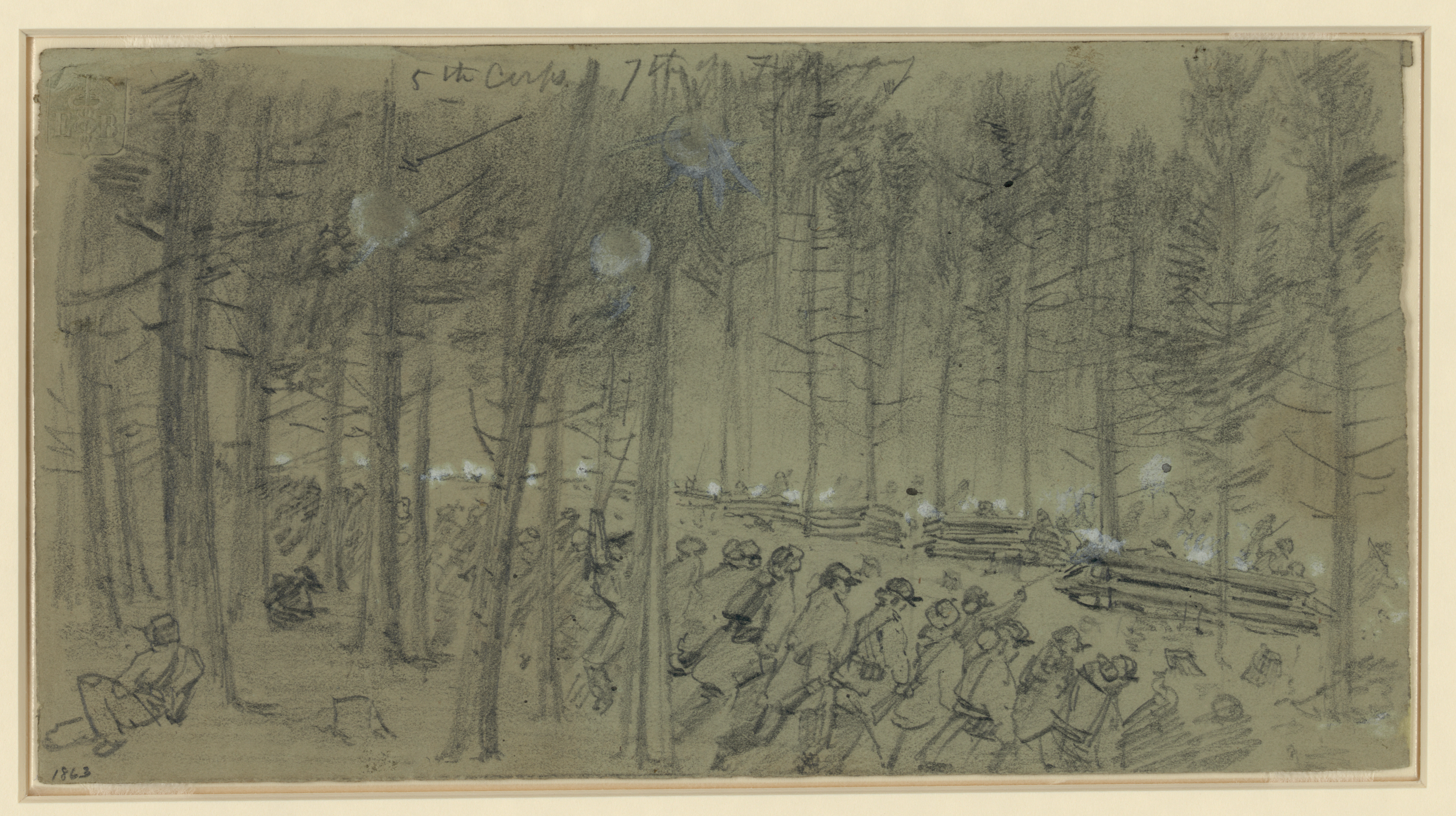
Alfred Waud's illustration of the U.S. Army's 5th Corps, Battle of Hatcher's Run, February 7, 1865.

Four months later, Vanderslice performed the act of valor for which he would later be awarded the U.S. Medal of Honor. On February 6, 1865, while fighting with the 8th Pennsylvania Cavalry in the Battle of Hatcher's Run, he became the first man to reach the rifle pits of the Confederate States Army during a charge made by his regiment on CSA fortifications.

Assigned next with his regiment to the war-ending Appomattox Campaign during the spring of 1865, he participated in the battles of Five Forks (April 1) and Sailor's Creek (April 6) before his fight was brought to a swift end at Farmville, Virginia during the April 7 Battle of Cumberland Church. Engaged at that time in a sabre charge, he was toppled from his saddle as the horse he was riding was killed. Captured by Confederate troops and held briefly as a prisoner of war until General Robert E. Lee's surrender at Appomattox on April 9, he was then honorably discharged by General Order on July 12, 1865.

== Post-war life ==
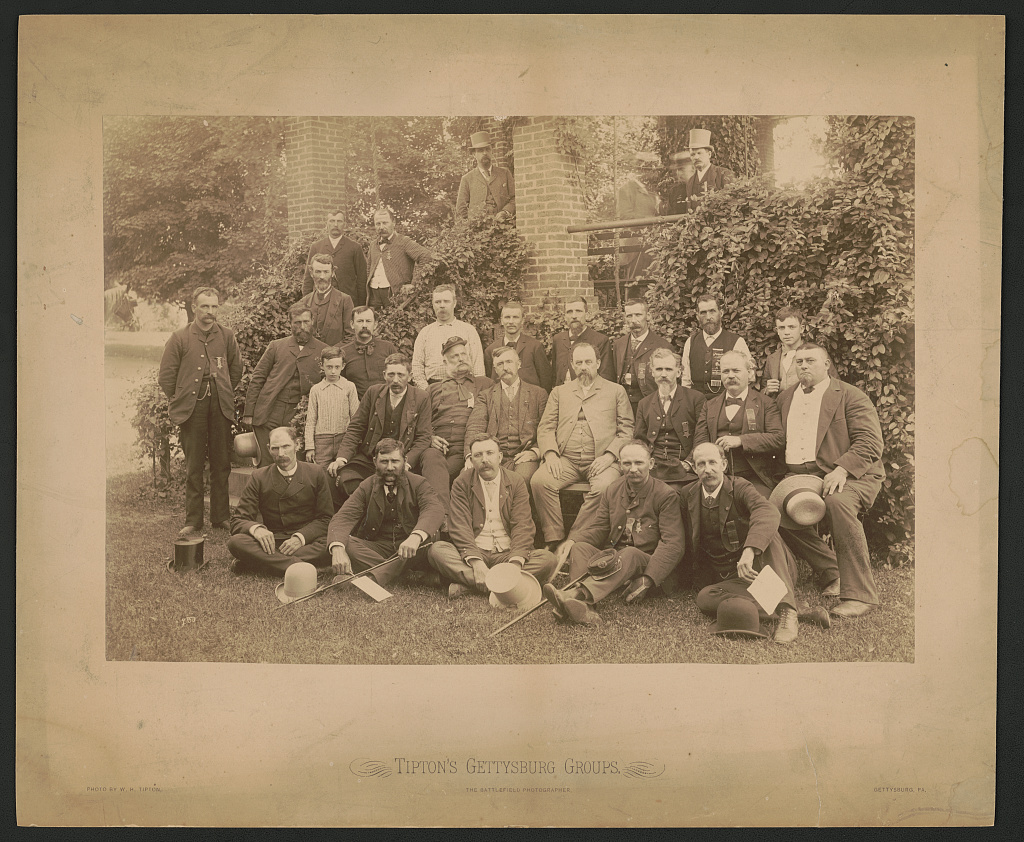
John M. Vanderslice, the man in the bowtie to the left of the boy (his son), was photographed c. 1885 with survivors of the 8th Pennsylvania Cavalry at their reunion in Gettysburg.

Following his honorable discharge from the military, Vanderslice returned home to Pennsylvania, where he completed his studies at the Freeland Seminary, trained to become a lawyer, and became active in politics as a member of the Republican Party. Admitted to the Philadelphia bar in 1869 after completing three years of legal studies with prominent Philadelphia lawyer Theodore Cuyler, Vanderslice also quickly rose to prominence as an attorney through his representation of the Baltimore & Ohio Railroad. In 1870, he wed Caroline Cecilia Hamer, a daughter of Collegeville physician James Hamer. According to historian Ellwood Roberts, she was "not only a fine classical scholar, but an accomplished musician" who had graduated from the Pennsylvania Female College, and who was descended on her mother's side from Cotton Mather. Together, Vanderslice and his wife welcomed the births of: Miriam, Stanley, Ethel, Edith, Clarence, and Mabel. In 1884, Vanderslice was nominated by U.S. President Chester A. Arthur to be a Philadelphia-based pension agent for the federal government.

An active member of the Grand Army of the Republic (G.A.R.), who served as a department commander during the 1880s, and under whose leadership the G.A.R.'s membership was expanded across Pennsylvania from 4,500 to 25,000, he was also appointed to the commission which helped establish the Soldiers' Home in Erie, Pennsylvania, and became a key member of the Gettysburg Battlefield Monument Association. According to historian Tom Huntington, "Vanderslice persuaded a GAR post in Erie, Pa., to erect the first monument on the battlefield, a small stone on Little Round Top honoring Strong Vincent, a Pennsylvania brigade commander mortally wounded on the battle’s second day." During his tenure of service with the GBMA, Vanderslice was ultimately appointed as director of the association, representing the association at the dedication of monuments to the 69th and 71st Pennsylvania Volunteers at the Gettysburg National Battlefield nearly a quarter of a century after the Battle of Gettysburg had been waged there, as well as five years later when the High Water Mark Monument was unveiled.

A Baptist, Vanderslice was a member of Philadelphia's Grace Church.

== Death and interment ==
Vanderslice died in Collegeville, Pennsylvania on March 12, 1915, and was buried at the Saint James Episcopal Church Cemetery, which is located on the north side of the Germantown Pike in Collegeville.

== Medal of Honor citation ==
Rank and organization: Private, Company D, 8th Pennsylvania Cavalry. Place and date: At Hatcher's Run, Va. February 6, 1865. Entered service at:------. Birth: Philadelphia, Pa. Date of Issue: September 1, 1893. Citation:

The President of the United States of America, in the name of Congress, takes pleasure in presenting the Medal of Honor to Private John Mitchell Vanderslice, United States Army, for extraordinary heroism on February 6, 1865, while serving with Company D, 8th Pennsylvania Cavalry, in action at Hatcher's Run, Virginia. Private Vanderslice was the first man to reach the enemy's rifle pits, which were taken in the charge.

== Publications ==
- Vanderslice, John Mitchell. Gettysburg Then and Now: The Field of American Valor, Where and How the Regiments Fought and the Troops They Encountered. New York, New York: G.W. Dillingham Co., 1899 (reprint: Morningside, Dayton, Ohio, 1983). OCLC 904346588

== See also ==
- Cavalry in the American Civil War
- List of American Civil War Medal of Honor recipients: T-Z
- Pennsylvania in the American Civil War
