= Charles Henry Smith (Army Medal of Honor) =

American brigadier general (1827–1902)

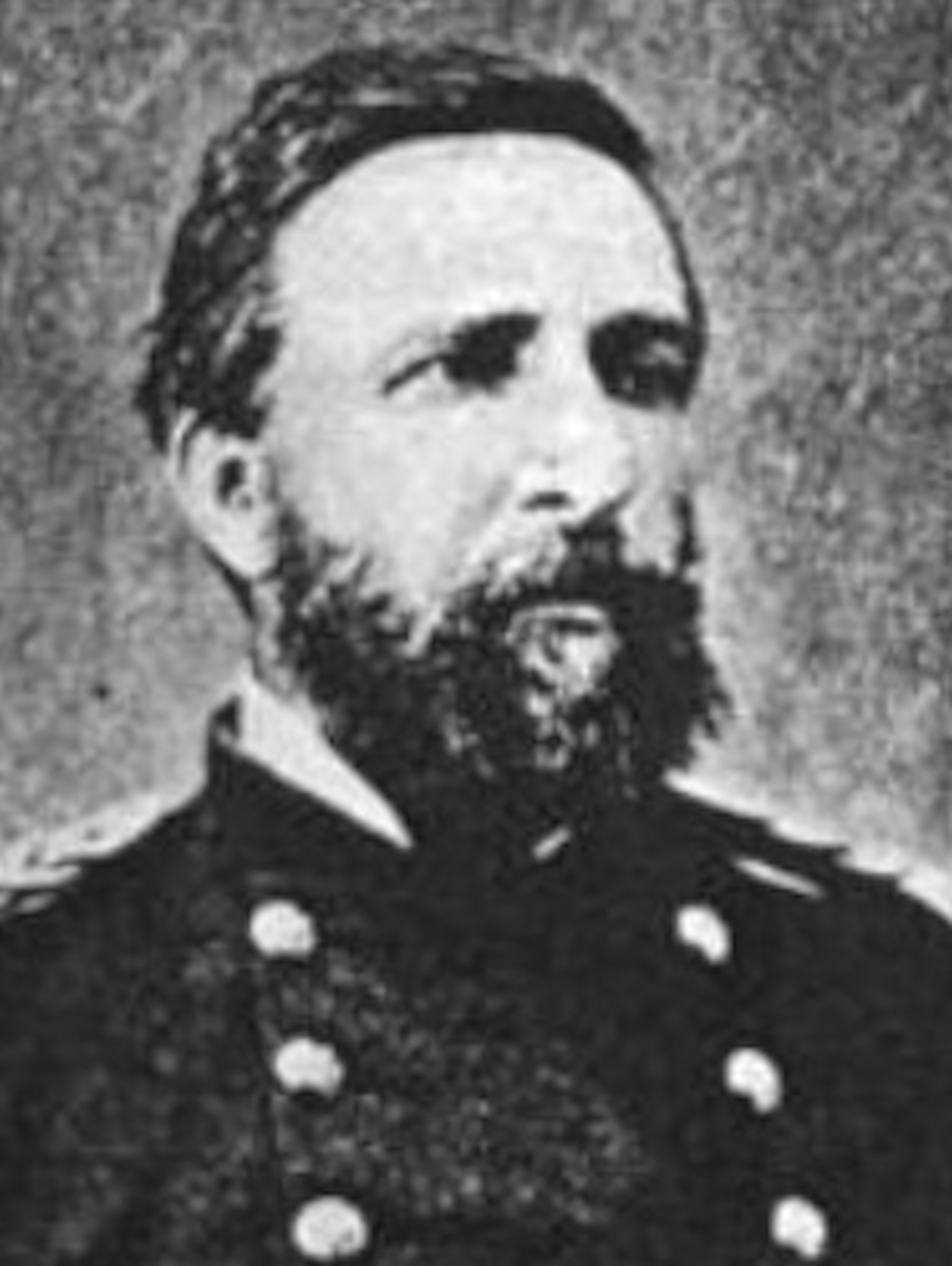
- Charles Henry Smith, 1st Maine Volunteer Cavalry, c. 1865
- Born: November 1, 1827; Hollis, Maine, US
- Died: July 17, 1902 (aged 74); Washington, D.C., US
- Burial place: Arlington National Cemetery
- Military career
- Allegiance: United States
- Branch: United States Army; Union Army
- Service years: 1861–1891
- Rank: Colonel; Brevet Major General
- Units: 1st Maine Cavalry Regiment; 19th U.S. Infantry Regiment
- Conflicts: American Civil War: First Battle of Winchester; Battle of Cedar Mountain; Battle of Second Bull Run; Battle of South Mountain; Battle of Antietam; Battle of Fredericksburg; Stoneman's 1863 raid; Battle of Brandy Station; Battle of Gettysburg; Battle of Mine Run; Battle of Todd's Tavern; Battle of Haw's Shop; Battle of Old Church; Battle of Cold Harbor; Battle of Trevilian Station; Battle of St. Mary's Church; Second Battle of Ream's Station; Battle of Boydton Plank Road; Appomattox Campaign; Battle of Dinwiddie Court House; Battle of Five Forks; Battle of Sailor's Creek; Appomattox Court House
- Awards: Medal of Honor

Charles Henry Smith (November 1, 1827 – July 17, 1902) was a U.S. Army officer who was awarded the Medal of Honor for gallantry in the American Civil War.

== Personal ==
Smith was born in Hollis, Maine. He taught school before the Civil War. He married Mary R. L. Livermore in 1850. She died on December 18, 1897, in Washington, D.C. He never remarried and died in Washington on July 17, 1902. He is buried in Arlington National Cemetery next to his wife. His younger brother, George Washington Smith, served as a 90-day volunteer as a sergeant in Co I, 3rd Massachusetts Infantry, reenlisting in the 18th Massachusetts Infantry where he served from August 1861 to September 1864.

== Military ==
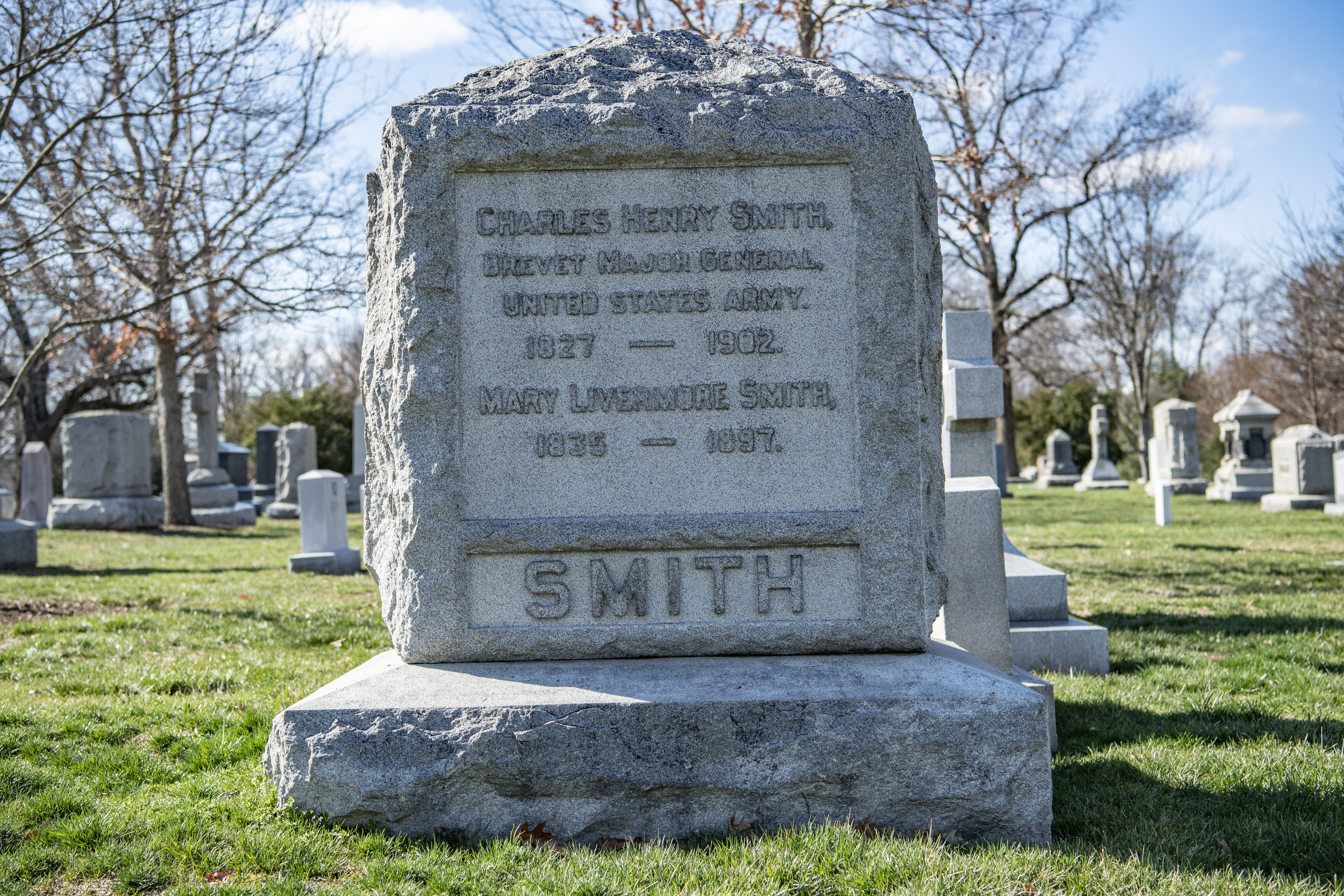
Grave at Arlington National Cemetery

During the Civil War, Smith was a member of the 1st Maine Cavalry Regiment. He was commissioned a captain in November 1861 and took command of Company D. He served well and was promoted to major on February 16, 1863. Promoted again on March 26 to lieutenant colonel, he participated in the Stoneman 1863 raid. He commanded the regiment in Col. Douty's absence at Brandy Station, assuming command after Douty's death at Aldie June 17, 1863, when he was promoted colonel. He commanded through the rest of the Gettysburg Campaign. He was breveted to brigadier general on August 20, 1864, and took command of the brigade. He ended the war at Appomattox, having commanded several brigades and a division.

He earned his Medal of Honor for his actions at the Battle of St. Mary's Church in October 1864. Issued on April 11, 1895, his citation read:

The President of the United States of America, in the name of Congress, takes pleasure in presenting the Medal of Honor to Colonel (Cavalry) Charles Henry Smith, United States Army, for extraordinary heroism on 24 June 1864, while serving with 1st Maine Cavalry, in action at St. Mary's Church, Virginia. Colonel Smith remained in the fight to the close, although severely wounded.

— D. S. Lamont, Secretary of War

He remained in the army after the war and retired as a colonel in 1891.

He was a companion of the District of Columbia Commandery of the Military Order of the Loyal Legion of the United States.
