= 8th Pennsylvania Cavalry Regiment =

Union Army cavalry regiment

8th Pennsylvania Cavalry
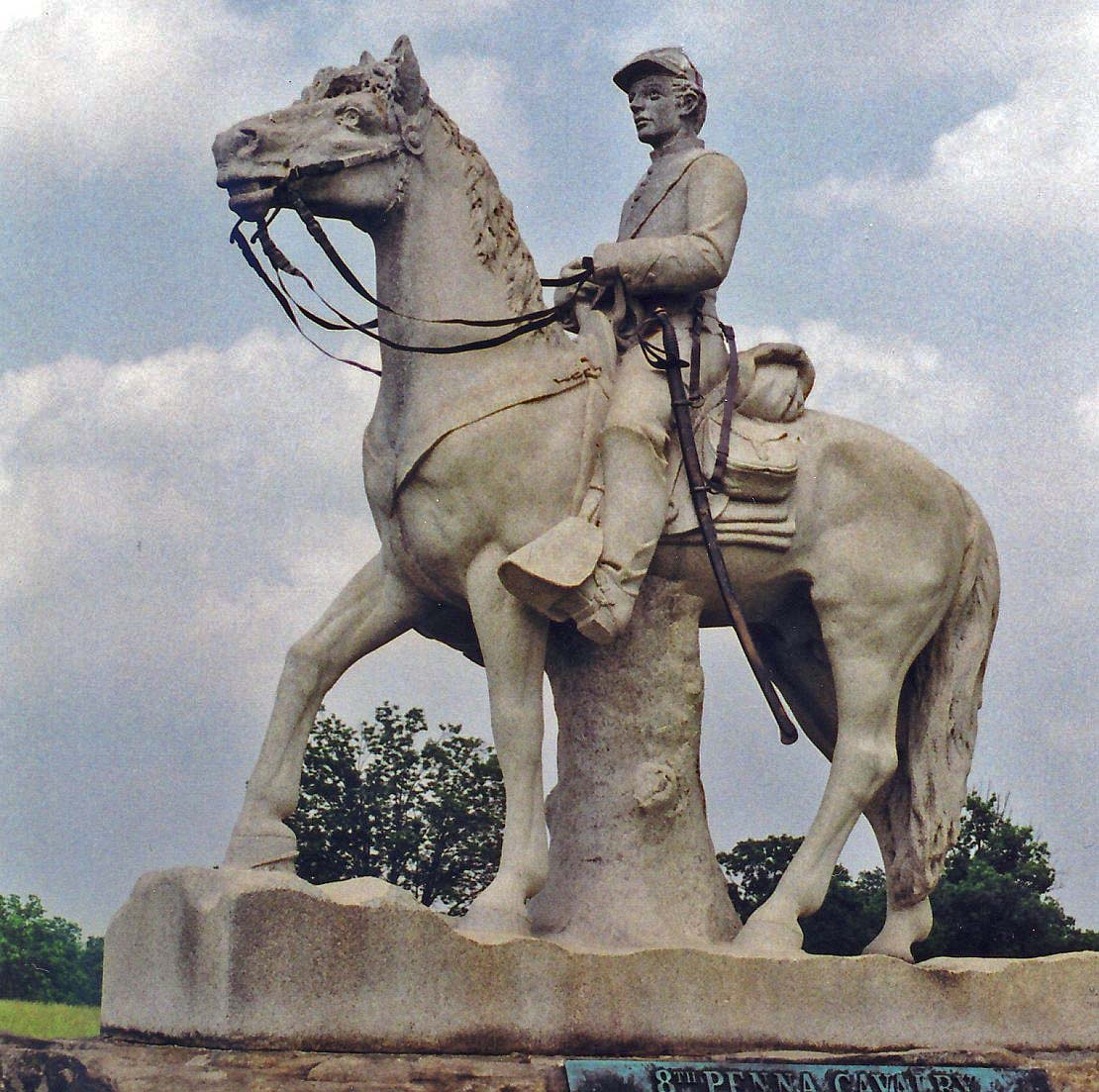
- 8th Pennsylvania Cavalry Monument, Gettysburg National Battlefield, Pennsylvania
- Active: August 1861 to July 24, 1865
- Country: United States
- Allegiance: Union
- Branch: Cavalry
- Engagements: Siege of Yorktown; Battle of Seven Pines; Seven Days Battles; Battle of Antietam; Battle of Fredericksburg; Battle of Chancellorsville; Battle of Gettysburg; Bristoe Campaign; Mine Run Campaign; Battle of the Wilderness; Battle of Todd's Tavern; Battle of Spotsylvania Court House; Battle of Yellow Tavern; Battle of Haw's Shop; Battle of Cold Harbor; Battle of Trevilian Station; Siege of Petersburg; Battle of Jerusalem Plank Road; Battle of Saint Mary's Church; First Battle of Deep Bottom; Second Battle of Ream's Station; Battle of Peebles's Farm; Battle of Hatcher's Run; Appomattox Campaign; Battle of Five Forks; Battle of Sailor's Creek; Battle of Cumberland Church; Battle of Appomattox Court House

The 8th Pennsylvania Cavalry (89th Volunteers) was a cavalry regiment that served in the Union Army during the American Civil War.

== Service ==
First intended to be equipped as a volunteer infantry regiment (Note: It was slated to be the 89th of the Pennsylvania line, a rifle regiment.) the 8th Pennsylvania Volunteer Cavalry was recruited in Philadelphia, Pennsylvania and in Lycoming, Bucks and Schuylkill counties. It was mustered into the Federal service from July 23 to September 17, 1861, at Philadelphia, for a three years' term under the command of Colonel Ernest G. Chorman. It left the state for Washington on October 4, where it was brigaded with the 3rd Pennsylvania cavalry in Daniel Butterfield's 3rd Brigade of Fitz John Porter’s Division. The regiment spent the winter in the vicinity of the capital in the performance of various routine duties. On January 17, 1862, the vacancy caused by the retirement of Col. Chorman was filled by the appointment of Capt. David McMurtrie Gregg, of the 6th U. S. Cavalry, (Note: Gregg was an experienced cavalry officer and a graduate of West Point in the Class of 1855.).

In the Peninsular campaign the brigade was enlarged by the addition of the 1st U.S. Cavalry and was attached to the Army of the Potomac’s (AoP) IV Corps. . It shared in a light skirmish at New Kent Court House and soon after participated in a severe skirmish near Garnett's house, where it suffered its first losses. In April 1862, the regiment was moved to Blake's Brigade, Cavalry Reserve, Army of the Potomac, to July 1862. It was present at the Battle of Fair Oaks and active at Malvern hill. During this campaign companies D, A and B were detached from the regiment on special duties.

Upon the AoP’s retreat to Harrison's landing, Col. Gregg moved up to the 8th’s cavalry brigade which was employed in heavy picket duties. As part of Stoneman's division, its brigade moved with Pleasonton's brigade to Yorktown, serving as rear-guard, but returned to Alexandria just after the second Bull Run battle.

On September 4, it was sent to Freedom Hill, encountering the enemy there, at Sugarloaf Mountain and Darnestown. It was now in the 2nd Brigade of Pleasanton's Cavalry Division. On the 12th it entered Frederick and drove out the rear-guard of the enemy's cavalry, capturing a number of prisoners. It then moved on a reconnaissance north into Pennsylvania to Gettysburg, (Note: The Cumberland Valley being a natural invasion route of the north from Virginia, even in 1862, Rebels reached Gettysburg.) captured about 50 more prisoners, and thence marched to the Antietam battlefield, skirmishing on the Sharpsburg Pike on the day after the battle. 00 It remained encamped at Sharpsburg for a time; had a sharp engagement with the enemy at Charlestown; and on October 26, as a part of Pleasonton's cavalry, led the advance of the army into Virginia, being engaged in rapid succession with heavy losses at Philomont, Upperville, Aldie, Barbour's Crossroads, Ashby's Gap, Chester Gap, Orleans, Amissville and Hazel River. It was next assigned to picket duty at the fords of the Rapidan and Rappahannock, and while in the vicinity of Leeds, a squadron under Capt. ·Wilson, was captured after a spirited resistance.

Under the command of Lieut. Col. Amos E. Griffiths, the regiment moved to Fredericksburg on the night before the battle and had one squadron engaged on the following day. When Brig. Gen. Bayard fell, Col. Gregg took command of the division and was officially notified on the field of his promotion to brigadier general. Maj. Huey succeeded to the command of the regiment on June 17, 1862. The regiment now returned to Falmouth and was employed in scout and picket duty along the Rappahannock, going into winter quarters at Acquia creek about the middle of February 1863. While here it was assigned. to Col. Devin's brigade of Pleasonton's division, comprising the 8th and 17th Pa. and 6th N. Y. cavalry.

On April 21 it embarked upon the Chancellorsville campaign and in the first day's fighting at Chancellorsville suffered heavily in killed, wounded and horses. On May 2, it made one of the most gallant charges in the war, winning for itself the following commendation from Gen. Pleasonton: "The distinguished gallantry of the 8th Pa. regiment, in charging the head of the enemy's column, advancing on the XI corps, on the evening of the 2nd inst., has excited the highest admiration. * * * The gallant McVikar, the generous chivalric Keenan, with 150 killed and wounded from your small numbers. attest the terrible earnestness that animated the midnight conflict of the second of May."

After the battle, it moved to Potomac creek, and on the 14th to Acquia creek and Falmouth, being engaged in picket duties until the Gettysburg campaign. It was in action at New Market, losing 15 killed and wounded, and as part of the 2nd brigade, 2nd cavalry division, it moved on the 30th to Westminster, thence to Hanover Junction and on July 4, to Emmitsburg, where it joined the command of Brig. Gen. Kilpatrick, crossed South Mountain and assisted in the capture of 250 wagons and 600 prisoners of the enemy's wagon train.

During the next few days, it was engaged in constant skirmishing in the vicinity of Boonesboro and Jones' cross-roads. Returning to Virginia, it was engaged in guard and picket duty on the Manassas railroad and at Thoroughfare Gap, and in August it became a part of the 1st brigade commanded by Gen. J. Irvin Gregg. In the campaign which followed, the regiment was heavily engaged at Sulphur springs, and was again in action two days later at Bristoe Station. In the advance to Mine Run, it was sharply engaged at New Hope Church and on its return went into winter quarters at Bealeton Station. During the winter it engaged in raids into the Luray Valley and through Chester gap. Most of the men reenlisted at this time and were given veteran furloughs by battalions.

Upon the opening of the Wilderness campaign the 8th participated in the various movements and battles of Sheridan's corps, losing about 100 men on the Richmond raid, 25 at Haw's shop, and 35 at Trevilian Station. At St. Mary's Church, Gregg's division was attacked by superior numbers, and the 8th again lost heavily, Col. Huey and Capt. Piggott being captured, and some 40 men being killed, wounded or missing.

On July 1, it crossed the James with its division, moved to Blackwater, and was engaged on picket duty until the 26th on the Jerusalem plank road. It then crossed the Appomattox and the James; was in action at Malvern hill, and again on the Charles City road. About two weeks later it was again engaged at Charles City Road and in August was in action the whole day at Yellow Tavern, where Lieut. Col.·Wilson was among the wounded, and the command devolved on Maj. Wistar. The regiment was now reduced to about 200 men fit for duty. At Reams' station, on Aug. 23, Maj. Wistar was among the wounded and the command devolved on Capt. Alex. McCallum, all its field officers having been killed, wounded or captured.

It participated in the cavalry operations during the siege of Petersburg and in the spring of 1865, moved with Sheridan to Five Forks, participating in a brilliant campaign which resulted in the surrender of Lee, after which the 8th was ordered to Lynchburg and consolidated with the 16th Pennsylvania Cavalry on July 24. It was finally mustered out with that organization on Aug. 11 1865, at Richmond.

== Detailed service ==
=== 1861-1862 ===
Left Pennsylvania for Washington, D.C., October 4, 1861. Duty at Arlington Heights, Va., defenses of Washington, D.C., until March 1862. Advance on Manassas, Va., March 10–15. Moved to the Virginia Peninsula April. Siege of Yorktown April 11-May 4. Baltimore Cross Roads, near New Kent Court House, May 13. Operations about Bottom's Bridge May 20–23. Reconnaissance toward Richmond and to Turkey Island Creek Bridge May 23. Savage Station May 24. Reconnaissance to Seven Pines May 24–27. Chickahominy May 24. Garnett's Farm and White Oak May 27. Battle of Fair Oaks (Seven Pines) May 31-June 1. Reconnaissance to White Oak Swamp June 22–23. Seven days before Richmond June 25-July 1. Bottom's Bridge June 28–29. Savage Station June 29. Malvern Hill July 1. At Harrison's Landing until August 16. (Company A at the Headquarters of Gen. Porter; Company B at the Headquarters of Gen. McClellan; Company D at the Headquarters of Gen. P. St. G. Cooke.) Turkey Island Bridge July 20. Reconnaissance to Malvern Hill July 23. Retreat from the Peninsula and movement to Alexandria. Maryland Campaign September. Falls Church September 3–4. Sugar Loaf Mountain September 10–11. Frederick September 12. Middletown September 13. Battle of Antietam September 16–17. Boteller's Ford, Sharpsburg, Md., September 19. Shepherdstown Ford September 19. Amissville September 30. Reconnaissance from Sharpsburg to Shepherdstown and Martinsburg, W. Va., October 1 (3 companies). Philomont November 1–2. Castleman's Ferry, Upperville, Union, and Bloomfield November 2–3. Aldie and Ashby's Gap November 3. Markham Station November 4. Barbee's Cross Roads November 5. Waterloo Bridge November 7. Hazel River November 8. Newby's Cross Roads, near Amissville, November 10. Philomont November 19. Leed's Ferry and King George Court House December 2. Battle of Fredericksburg December 12–15.

=== 1863 ===
Chancellorsville Campaign April 27-May 6. 1863. Richard's Ford and Barnett's Ford April 29. Ely's Ford Road April 30. Chancellorsville May 1–2. Salem Heights and Banks' Ford May 4. Aldie June 17. Middleburg June 19. Upperville June 21. Thoroughfare Gap June 25. Westminster, Md., June 30. Battle of Gettysburg July 1–3. Monterey Gap July 4. Smithsburg July 5. Williamsport and Hagerstown, Md., July 6. Boonsboro July 8. Jones' Cross Roads, near Williamsport, July 10 and 13. Hagerstown July 10–13. St. James College July 11–12. Williamsport Road July 14. Shepherdstown July 16. Rixey's Ford September 2. Advance from the Rappahannock to the Rapidan September 13–17. Culpeper Court House September 13. Rapidan Station September 15–16. Robertson's River September 22. Bristoe Campaign October 9–22. Near Warrenton October 11. Warrenton or White Sulphur Springs October 12. Auburn and Bristoe October 14. St. Stephen's Church October 14. Advance to line of the Rappahannock November 7–8. Mine Run Campaign November 26-December 2. New Hope Church November 27. Blind Ferry December 5. Raid to Luray Valley December 21–23. Regiment reenlisted December 31, 1863.

=== 1864 ===
Raid through Chester Gap January 1–4, 1864. Rapidan Campaign May–June 1864. Todd's Tavern May 5–8. Spotsylvania Court House May 8–21. Sheridan's Raid to James River May 9–24. Matapony Church May 9. North Anna River May 9–10. Ground Squirrel Church and Yellow Tavern May 11. Brook Church or Fortifications of Richmond May 12. Haxall's Landing May 18. Line of the Pamunkey May 26–28. Battle of Totopotomoy Creek May 28–31. Haw's Shop May 28. Cold Harbor May 31-June 1. Sumner's Upper Bridge June 2. Sheridan's Trevillian Raid June 7–24. Trevillian Station June 11–12. White House or St. Peter's Church June 21. Black Creek or Tunstall Station June 21. St. Mary's Church June 24. Siege of Petersburg and Richmond June 1864 to April 1865. Warwick Swamp July 12. Charles City Cross Roads July 15–16. Demonstration north of the James River at Deep Bottom July 27–29. Malvern Hill July 28. Warwick Swamp July 30. Demonstration north of the James River at Deep Bottom August 13–20. Gravel Hill August 14. Strawberry Plains and Deep Run August 14–18. Charles City Cross Roads August 16. Dinwiddie Road, near Ream's Station, August 23. Ream's Station August 25. Belcher's Mills September. 17. Poplar Springs Church September 29-October 2. Arthur's Swamp September 30-October 1. Boydton Plank Road, Hatcher's Run, October 27–28. Reconnaissance to Stony Creek November 7. Stony Creek Station December 1. Bellefield Raid December 7–12.

=== 1865 ===
Dabney's Mills, Hatcher's Run, February 5–7, 1865. Appomattox Campaign March 28-April 9. Dinwiddie Court House March 30–31. Five Forks April 1. Paine's Cross Roads and Amelia Springs April 5. Battle of Sailor's Creek April 6. Farmville April 7. Appomattox Court House April 9. Surrender of Lee and his army. Expedition to Danville April 23–29. Duty at Lynchburg and in the Department of Virginia until July.

== Casualties ==
The regiment lost a total of 188 men during service; 5 officers and 55 enlisted men killed or mortally wounded, 2 officers and 126 enlisted men died of disease.

== Commanders ==
- Colonel Ernest G. Chorman - resigned January 1862
- Colonel David McMurtrie Gregg - promoted to brigadier general November 29, 1862
- Colonel Pennock Huey - captured at Saint Mary's Church June 24, 1864; returned to the regiment after parole on December 9, 1864. Promoted to brevet brigadier general March 13, 1865.
- Brevet Colonel Samuel Wilson - discharged October 17, 1864
- Colonel William A. Corrie - commanded the regiment during the Battle of Gettysburg while still at the rank of captain
- Lieutenant Colonel Amos E. Griffiths - commanded at the Battle of Fredericksburg
- Captain Peter Keenan - commanded at the Battle of Antietam

== Notable members ==
- Commissary Sergeant John Galloway - Medal of Honor recipient for action at the Battle of Cumberland Church
- Private John M. Vanderslice, Company D - Medal of Honor recipient for action at the Battle of Hatcher's Run

== See also ==
- List of Pennsylvania Civil War regiments
- Pennsylvania in the American Civil War

== Notes/References/Sources ==
Notes

Sources

- Acken, J. Gregory (2019). Blue-Blooded Cavalryman: Captain William Brooke Rawle in the Army of the Potomac, May 1863–August 1865 (pdf). Civil War Soldiers and Strategies (1st ed.). Kent, OH: The Kent State University Press. p. 352. doi:10.1353/book66989. ISBN 978-1-61277-798-6. LCCN 2019010987. OCLC 1097973861.
- Carpenter, James Edward. A List of the Battles, Engagements, Actions and Important Skirmishes in Which the Eighth Pennsylvania Cavalry Participated During the War of 1861-1865 (Philadelphia: Allen, Lane & Scott's Print. House), 1886.
- Ceremonies at Dedication of Monument of the Eighth Penna. Cavalry Regiment at Gettysburg, September 1, 1890: With Historical Sketch of the Regiment (S.l.: s.n.), 1890.
- Dyer, Frederick Henry (1908). A Compendium of the War of the Rebellion (PDF). Des Moines, IA: Dyer Pub. Co. pp. 31, 44, 214, 275, 282, 300, 324, 325, 1561, 1783. ASIN B01BUFJ76Q. This article incorporates text from this source, which is in the public domain.
- Federal Publishing Company (1908). Military Affairs and Regimental Histories of Maine, New Hampshire, Vermont, Massachusetts, Rhode Island, Connecticut, Pennsylvania, And Delaware (PDF). The Union Army: A History of Military Affairs in the Loyal States, 1861–65 – Records of the Regiments in the Union army – Cyclopedia of battles – Memoirs of Commanders and Soldiers. Vol. I. Madison, WI: Federal Publishing Company. pp. 424–426. OCLC 694018100. This article incorporates text from this source, which is in the public domain.
- Huey, Pennock. A True History of the Charge of the Eighth Pennsylvania Cavalry at Chancellorsville (Philadelphia: Porter & Coates), 1883.
- U.S. War Department (1889). Operations in Northern Virginia, West Virginia, Maryland, and Pennsylvania. November 15, 1862 – January 25, 1863. The War of the Rebellion: A Compilation of the Official Records of the Union and Confederate Armies. Vol. XXI–XXXIII. Washington, DC: U.S. Government Printing Office. pp. 54, 134, 362, 374, 375, 929. hdl:2027/coo.31924077723017. OCLC 857196196. This article incorporates text from this source, which is in the public domain.
- This article contains text from a text now in the public domain: Dyer, Frederick H. (1908). A Compendium of the War of the Rebellion. Des Moines, IA: Dyer Publishing Co.
