= Pennock Huey =

Union Army officer (1828–1903)

Pennock Huey (March 1, 1828 – September 28, 1903) was an officer and cavalry brigade commander in the Union Army during the American Civil War.

== Biography ==
Huey was the son of Jacob Huey, a farmer in Chester County, Pennsylvania known locally as "The Squire of Kennett Square". He pursued a career as a merchant before war broke out in 1861.

In September 1861, he became captain of Company D of the 8th Pennsylvania Cavalry (89th Pennsylvania Volunteers), serving under the regiment's colonel, David McMurtrie Gregg. Huey was promoted to major in January 1862. When Gregg became a brigade commander, Huey took command of the regiment and subsequently led it at the Battle of Chancellorsville, serving in the brigade of Thomas Devin. The brigade, including the 8th Pennsylvania, remained with the main body of the army, missing the futile raid George Stoneman led into south central Virginia. Huey's command became involved in a collision with Confederate infantry, from which it was only possible to extricate his troops by giving the order to; "Draw sabre and charge." This encounter on a back road, which cost the regiment substantial losses, later was magnified into a full-scale charge for which Cavalry commander Alfred Pleasonton took credit, claiming he had explicitly ordered Major Peter Keenan to go head to head with Jackson's troops. The charge, during which Keenan was killed, was completely inadvertent; the only way to extricate a column of cavalry from a narrow road thick with Confederate infantry.

Later on the evening of the charge, "Stonewall" Jackson, while out scouting the area for the presence of Union troops, was inadvertently shot by South Carolina troops having mistaken him and his party for Union soldiers.

After his failed raid, Stoneman was removed from command of the Cavalry Corps in the Army of the Potomac, being succeeded by Pleasonton. When the corps was reorganized later that month, Gregg took command of the new second division, mostly composed of his old division, the third. This new organization included the 8th Pennsylvania. Huey, meanwhile, had been promoted to colonel of the regiment on June 25, 1863. Huey took command of a brigade under Gregg in time for the Gettysburg Campaign. He was on detached duty during the Battle of Gettysburg protecting supply trains in Maryland, but he participated in the pursuit of the Confederate army. The brigade served under Hugh Judson Kilpatrick, not Gregg, during the pursuit.

Huey returned to regimental command for most of the remainder of 1863. He led his regiment under Philip Sheridan in the opening campaigns of 1864. Huey commanded Gregg's rear guard during part of the retreat from Trevilian Station. He was captured at the Battle of Saint Mary's Church, June 24, 1864. Paroled on December 9, 1864 at Camp Asylum, Columbia, South Carolina, after imprisonment in that state, Huey resumed his command. He was made a brevet brigadier general in March 1865 and was mustered out with his regiment at Richmond, Virginia, on August 11, 1865.

After the war, Huey married Elizabeth Waln Wistar, daughter of Joseph Wistar of Philadelphia, worked as a merchant and in the canal industry. He wrote his account of the charge at Chancellorsville to reclaim the credit he thought his due, contradicting Pleasonton's account of the action. Huey died on his farm at the age of 75 and was buried in Philadelphia. "Chapelcroft" Home of General Pennock Huey stood on the east side of Bustleton Ave between Murray and Fulmer Streets. ca 1892. Photo from "The York Road Old and New by Rev S F Hotchkin". The Chapelcroft Apts sit on the site today. https://www.facebook.com/photo.php?fbid=1407743312572774&set=gm.10154321012694662&type=3
