= David McMurtrie Gregg =

American Union Army general (1833–1916)

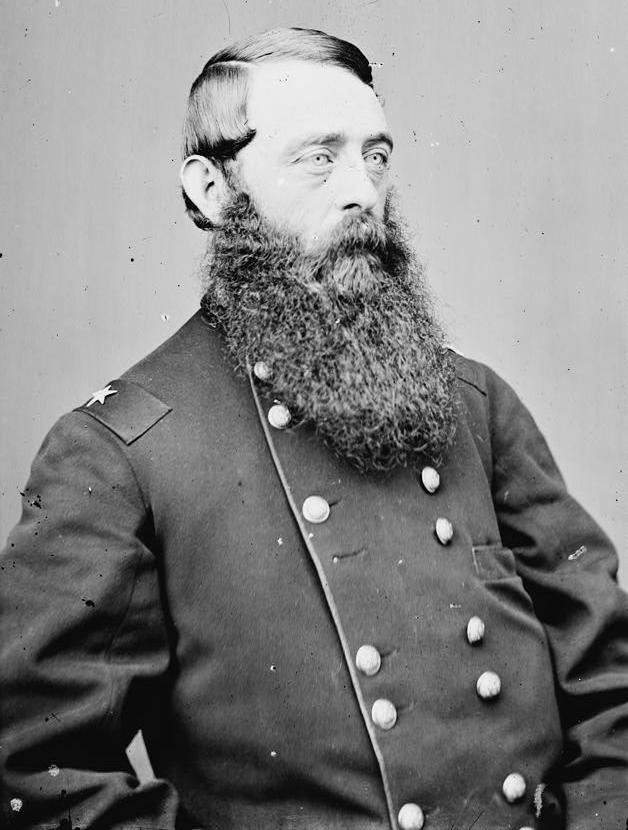
- Gregg, 1860–1865
- Born: April 10, 1833; Huntingdon, Pennsylvania, U.S.
- Died: August 7, 1916 (aged 83); Reading, Pennsylvania, U.S.
- Burial place: Charles Evans Cemetery; Reading, Pennsylvania, U.S.
- Military career
- Allegiance: United States of America; Union
- Branch: United States Army; Union Army
- Service years: 1855–1865
- Rank: Brigadier General; Brevet Major General
- Conflicts: American Indian Wars; American Civil War
- Other work: U.S. Consul; Pennsylvania Auditor General

David McMurtrie Gregg (April 10, 1833 – August 7, 1916) was an American farmer, diplomat, and a Union cavalry general in the American Civil War.

== Early life and career ==
Gregg was born in Huntingdon, Pennsylvania. He was the first cousin of future Pennsylvania Governor Andrew Curtin and the grandson of Pennsylvania Congressman Andrew Gregg. He graduated from the United States Military Academy (West Point) in 1855 and was given a commission as a brevet second lieutenant in the 2nd U.S. Dragoons Regiment (heavy cavalry). During his tenure at West Point, he interacted with two classmates who would become great cavalry generals—an opponent and a commander, respectively: J.E.B. Stuart, class of 1854, and Philip Sheridan, class of 1853.

His first real assignment was in the New Mexico Territory, as a company commander in the 1st U.S. Dragoons. His unit was ordered to California and he traveled with his friend Dorsey Pender; they later bought a racehorse together. His company then marched to Fort Vancouver, in Washington Territory. During this tour of duty, Lt. Gregg had his first taste of combat, engaged with 160 men against 1,000 Indian warriors, who had surrounded them. The fighting lasted for three days, although casualties were minor, and Gregg managed a fighting retreat.

== Civil War ==
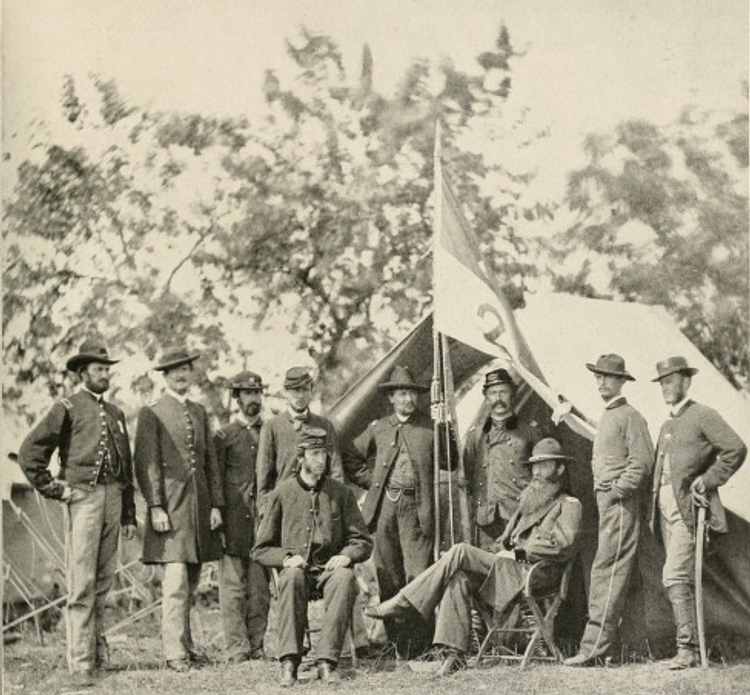
Union General David McMurtrie Gregg (seated with slouch hat and beard) and his staff

At the start of the Civil War, Gregg returned to Washington, D.C., where he was promoted to captain in the 3rd U.S. Cavalry, followed soon by a transfer to the 6th U.S. Cavalry. He developed typhoid fever and barely escaped death when his Washington hospital caught fire. In January 1862 he became colonel of the 8th Pennsylvania Cavalry.

Gregg and the 8th Pennsylvania fought in the Peninsula Campaign, where he distinguished himself in the Seven Days Battles, expertly screening retreating Union infantry. The Battle of Antietam was his next engagement, but cavalry played little role. He received a furlough and married Ellen F. Sheaff on October 6, 1862, in Montgomery County, Pennsylvania; the couple honeymooned in New York City.

Gregg was promoted to brigadier general just before the Battle of Fredericksburg. As at Antietam, the cavalry was underutilized and held in reserve. He commanded a brigade in the division of Alfred Pleasonton. Gregg was sent to assume command of another cavalry brigade when its commander, Brig. Gen. George Dashiell Bayard, was killed by an artillery shell that reached behind the infantry lines. After Maj. Gen. Joseph Hooker assumed command of the demoralized Army of the Potomac, he shook up the cavalry organization, because the mounted arm had not been used effectively. He removed cavalry units from corps and divisions, and consolidated them as a separate Cavalry Corps, under Maj. Gen. George Stoneman. Gregg assumed command of the 3rd Division in February 1863. (Although infantry divisions are typically commanded by major generals, few Union cavalry division leaders rose above brigadier general, and Gregg was no exception.)

At the Battle of Chancellorsville, Stoneman's corps, including Gregg's division, was dispatched on a raid around Lee's left flank to destroy facilities in his rear. The raid lasted nine days and caused a lot of destruction in the rear of the Army of Northern Virginia, but it accomplished little strategically and Stoneman was widely criticized for lack of aggression and not being able to draw any Confederate forces away from the main battle. Maj. Gen. Alfred Pleasonton replaced Stoneman in command of the Cavalry Corps.

During the start of the Gettysburg campaign, Lee's stealthy troop movements away from the Fredericksburg area caused Union consternation and Pleasonton was ordered to find out where they were going. Launching a surprise attack on Maj. Gen. J.E.B. Stuart at Brandy Station resulted in the largest predominantly cavalry engagement of the war. The initial assault crossed the Rappahannock River at Beverly Ford under command of Brig. Gen. John Buford. While Buford attacked, Gregg led the 2nd and 3rd Divisions across Kelly's Ford to attack the flank and rear of the Confederates on Fleetwood Hill, where Stuart's headquarters were located. The fighting was fierce, saber-wielding, and hand-to-hand. The Confederates managed to repulse Gregg. The battle overall was essentially a draw, although it surprised and humiliated Stuart, and orders left behind provided valuable intelligence about Lee's intentions to invade Maryland and Pennsylvania.

In the middle of the Gettysburg Campaign, Pleasonton reorganized his corps and Gregg now commanded the 2nd Division. He led it in cavalry engagements at Aldie, Middleburg, and Upperville. While his fellow, newly promoted division commander Brig. Gen. John Buford was initiating the Battle of Gettysburg on July 1, 1863, Gregg was still moving north. His division arrived mid-day on July 2 and took up positions to protect the right flank and rear of the Union Army. On July 3, three miles east of Gettysburg, in what is now called "East Cavalry Field", Stuart's forces collided with Gregg's division and Brig. Gen. George A. Custer's brigade of the 3rd Division. A lengthy mounted battle, including hand-to-hand combat, ensued. Both sides claimed victory.

On July 16, during the Battle of Williamsport in the Army of Northern Virginia's long Retreat from Gettysburg, Gregg's division clashed with the cavalry brigades of Brig. Gens. Fitzhugh Lee and John R. Chambliss near Shepherdstown.

In October 1863, Lee attempted to flank the Union army near Warrenton, Virginia. Gregg's division delayed Lee until the II Corps under Maj. Gen. Gouverneur K. Warren arrived to block the movement. Gregg caused an incident when, after this engagement, he did not get adequate mention in Maj. Gen. George G. Meade's after action report and demanded a court of inquiry to correct the record.

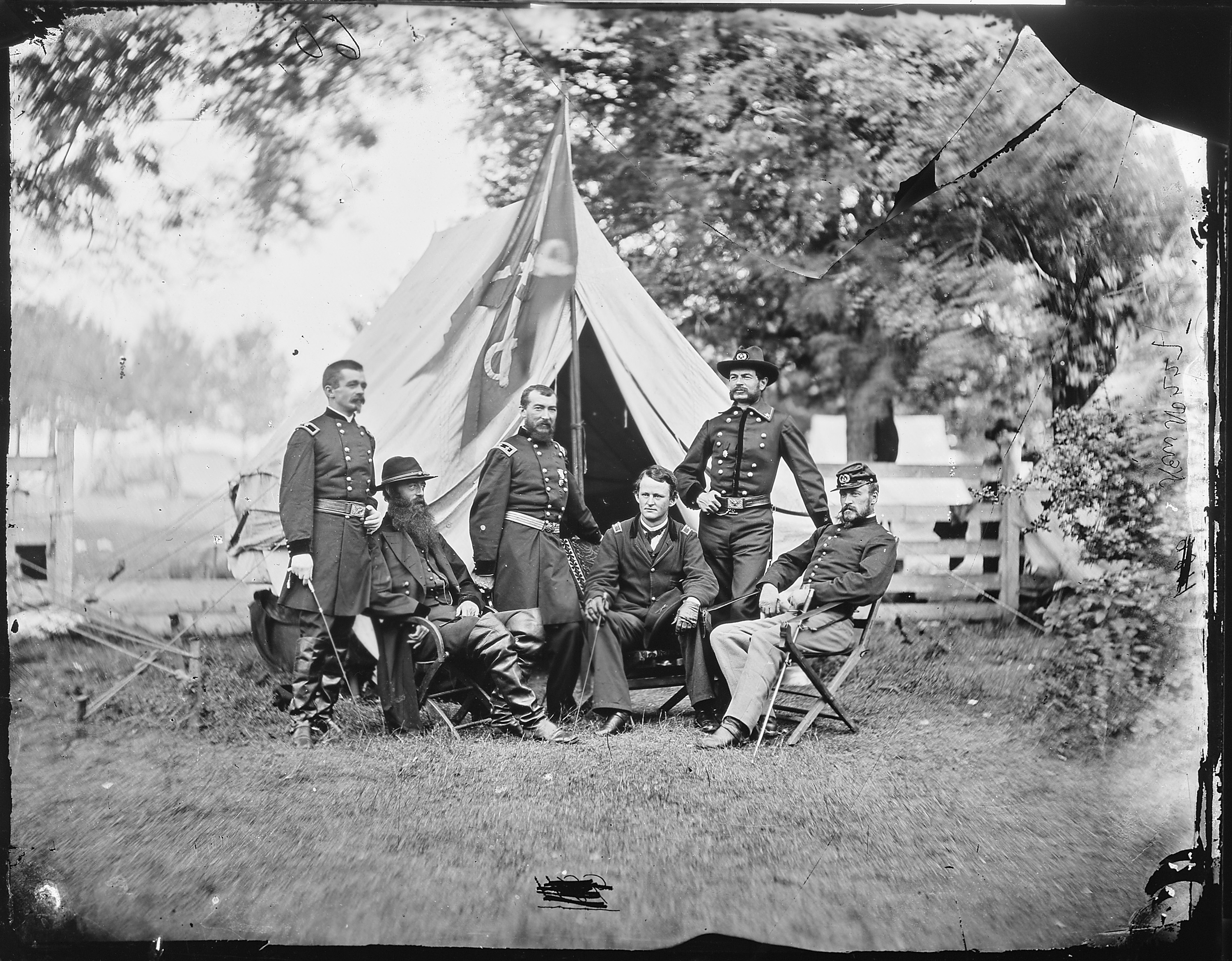
Gregg and others of the Cavalry Corps on the staff of Philip Sheridan 1864

Gregg commanded the Cavalry Corps of the Army of the Potomac in early 1864 until the arrival of Maj. Gen. Philip Sheridan, who commanded the cavalry of the forces of Lt. Gen. Ulysses S. Grant in the Overland Campaign. The most important use of Gregg's cavalry during this campaign was to screen Union movements southward, battle to battle, but a significant raid was staged that culminated in the Battle of Yellow Tavern, where J.E.B. Stuart was mortally wounded, dealing the Confederacy a hard blow. Gregg's division also was heavily engaged at the Battle of Haw's Shop, where it fought Wade Hampton's troopers west of Hanovertown, Virginia. Hampton had superior numbers, but Gregg's troopers had the Spencer repeating rifle. Finally, Custer's brigade attacked through difficult terrain, ousting Hampton's men from their position.

Concluding the raid culminating in the Battle of Trevilian Station, Sheridan's cavalry retreated toward Bermuda Hundred. Gregg's division covered the retreat, especially in the Battle of Saint Mary's Church. Gregg's division survived a strong attack directed by Wade Hampton, but it lost several prisoners, including Colonel Pennock Huey.

Gregg commanded the cavalry division that remained near Petersburg while Sheridan was engaged in the Shenandoah Valley Campaign against Jubal Early. In his role as cavalry commander, Gregg screened various union movements in the Siege of Petersburg. Gregg's division was particularly engaged at the Second Battle of Deep Bottom, the Second Battle of Ream's Station, and the Battle of Peebles' Farm.

== Later life ==
David Gregg resigned his army commission, in a letter dated January 25, 1865:

Having for more than three years been on uninterrupted service in the field, commanding cavalry in the Army of the Potomac, I at this time find such an imperative demand for my continued presence at home that my personal attention may be given to pressing private duties and business, that I can no longer defer action to secure my discharge from the service.

Gregg's resignation from the Regular Army and the volunteers was effective on February 9, 1865. On December 12, 1864, President Abraham Lincoln nominated Gregg for appointment to the grade of brevet major general of volunteers to rank from August 1, 1864. The United States Senate confirmed the appointment on February 14, 1865.

Gregg's real reasons for resigning before the end of the war are lost to history. According to Edward Longacre's biography of Gen. John Buford, Gregg feared a violent death in battle and described himself as a "coward" when, in late 1864, his nerve finally gave way and he resigned his commission. He missed exciting cavalry actions in the Appomattox Campaign. He settled in Reading, Pennsylvania, his wife's home. He farmed near Milford, Delaware, but his life was dull and he apparently regretted leaving the army. In 1868 he applied for reinstatement, but the cavalry command he wanted went to his cousin, John Irvin Gregg, so he remained an unhappy civilian. In 1874, he was appointed by President Grant to be U.S. Consul to Prague, Austria-Hungary, but soon returned home because his wife was homesick.

Gregg was active in state and local affairs and raised funds to preserve Valley Forge as a national shrine. He visited Gettysburg Battlefield numerous times and gave speeches at events. In 1891, he became active in politics and was elected to a four-year term as Auditor General of Pennsylvania. In 1899, he refused the Republican Party's nomination for the office of state treasurer, citing his declining health.

Gregg died in Reading, Pennsylvania, one of the oldest survivors of the war in the state, and is buried there in Charles Evans Cemetery. He is memorialized with a bronze equestrian statue in Reading, and the city's American Legion Post is named "Gregg Post" in his honor. The Gregg Cavalry Shaft, on East Cavalry Field in Gettysburg, Pennsylvania, honors both Union and Confederate forces who fought there.

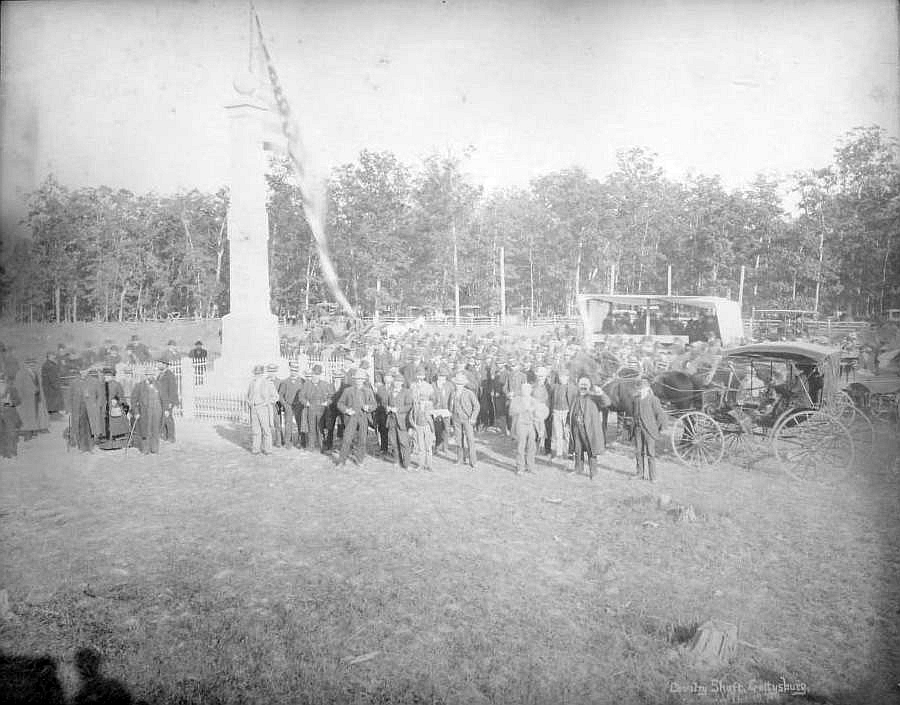
Dedication of the Gregg Cavalry Shaft, East Cavalry Field, Gettysburg, Pennsylvania, 1884.

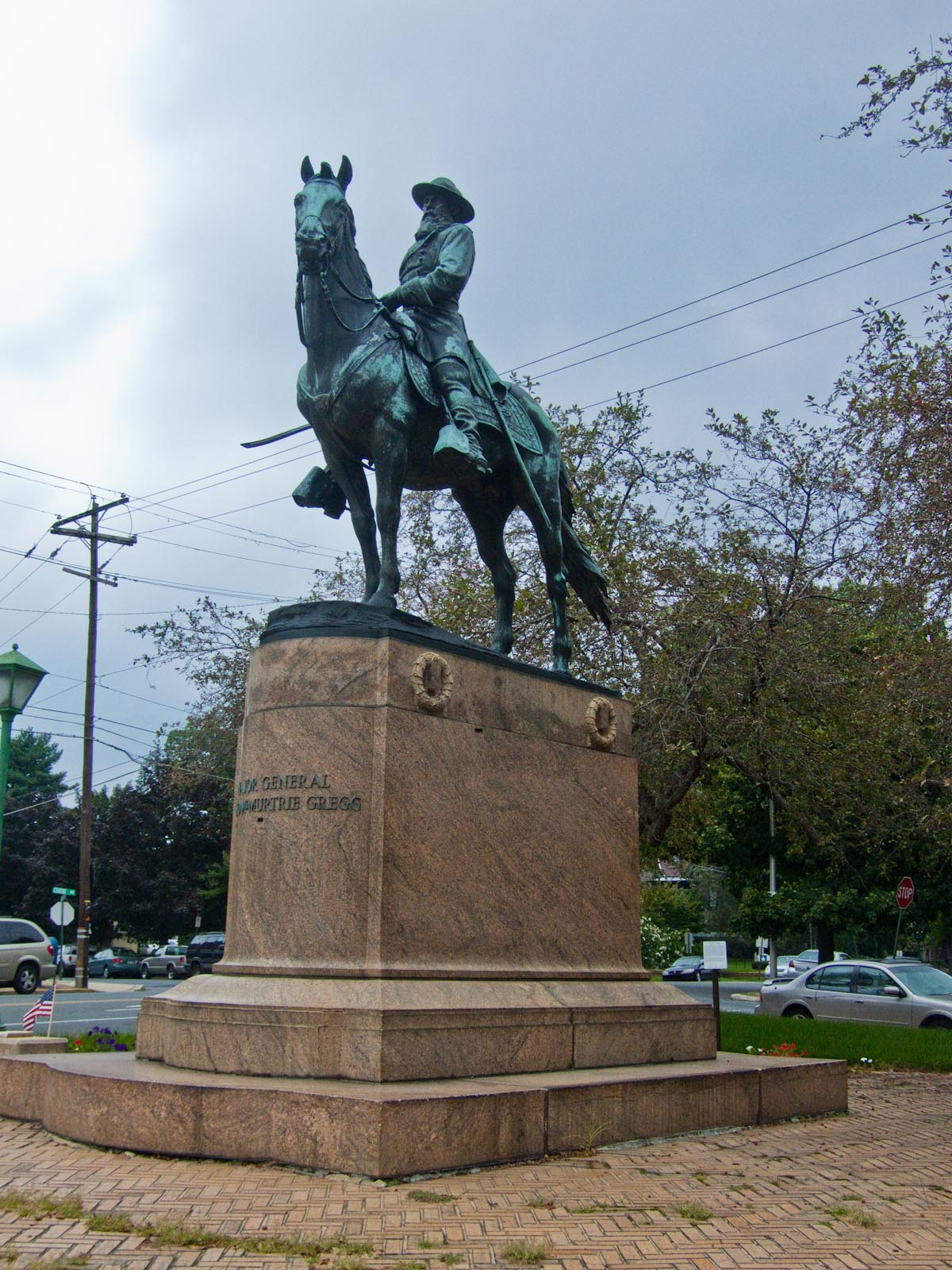
Major General David McMurtrie Gregg (1922), by Henry Augustus Lukeman, Centre Park, Reading, Pennsylvania.

== See also ==
- List of American Civil War generals (Union)

== Notes ==
Political offices
Preceded by Thomas McCamant	Pennsylvania Auditor General; 1892–1895	Succeeded by Amos H. Mylin
