= Todds Tavern, Virginia =

- Unincorporated community
- Location within Northern Virginia Location within Virginia Location within the United States
- Coordinates: 38°14′53″N 77°40′07″W
- Country: United States
- State: Virginia
- County: Spotsylvania
- Time zone: UTC−5 (Eastern (EST))
  - Summer (DST): UTC−4 (EDT)

Todds Tavern is an unincorporated community in Spotsylvania County, Virginia, United States, and was the site of the Battle of Todd's Tavern.

== History ==
Todds Tavern was the focal point of a cavalry battle on 7–8 May 1864, between the battles of the Wilderness and Spotsylvania Court House during the Civil War. The tavern location on Brock Road carried the name of Charles Todd who died about 1850. According to the historian Noel Harrison's research, the Todd family sold the property circa 1845 to Flavius Josephus Ballard, who re-sold the property in 1869. The intersection where the tavern stood still maintains the name "Todd's Tavern". Today, there is a convenience store at the crossroads where the original tavern sat.
