= Battle of Saint Mary's Church =

Part of the American Civil War

Coordinates: 37.4322°N 77.1506°W

Battle of Saint Mary's Church (Samaria Church)
- Part of the American Civil War
Date	June 24, 1864
Location	Charles City, Virginia
Result	Inconclusive

Belligerents
United States (Union)	(Confederate States of America) CSA (Confederacy)

Commanders and leaders
David McM. Gregg	Wade Hampton

Strength
2,147	4,000

Casualties and losses
350	250

The Battle of Saint Mary's Church (also called Samaria Church in the South, or Nance's Shop) was an American Civil War cavalry battle fought on June 24, 1864, as part of Union Lt. Gen. Ulysses S. Grant's Overland Campaign against Confederate Gen. Robert E. Lee's Army of Northern Virginia.

As Maj. Gen. Philip Sheridan's Union cavalry of the Army of the Potomac returned from their unsuccessful raid against the Virginia Central Railroad and the Battle of Trevilian Station, they gathered up supply wagons from the recently abandoned supply depot at White House and proceeded toward the James River. On June 24, the Confederate cavalry under Maj. Gen. Wade Hampton attacked the column of Brig. Gen. David McM. Gregg's division at St. Mary's Church. The Confederates outnumbered the Union cavalrymen five brigades to two and were able to drive them from their breastworks, but Gregg's men successfully screened the wagon train, which continued to move unmolested to the James.

== Background ==
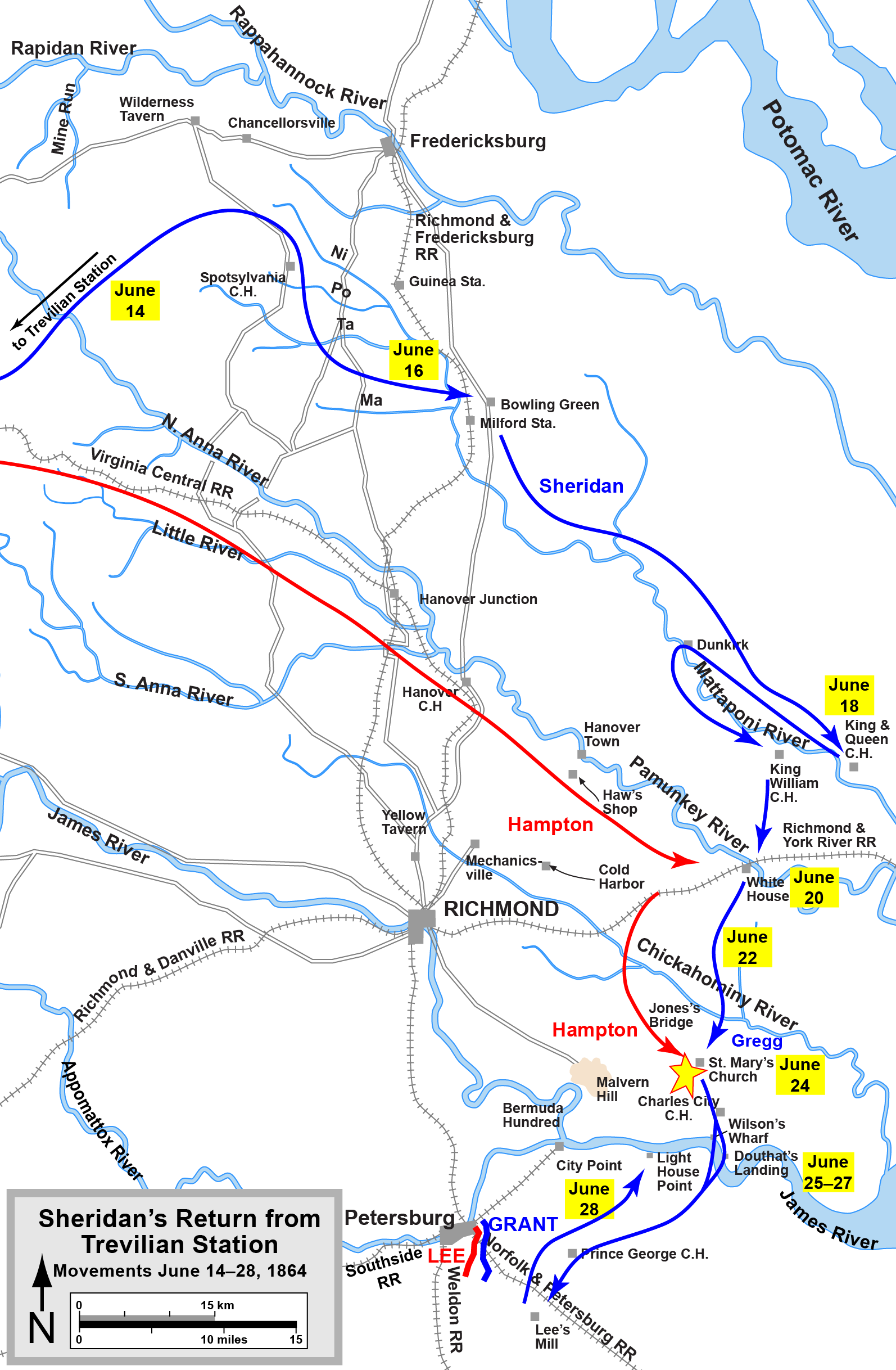
Sheridan's return to the Army of the Potomac from his Trevilian Station raid Confederate Union

Following the Battle of Trevilian Station (June 11–12, 1864), Sheridan's cavalry began to return on June 13 from their unsuccessful raid against the Virginia Central Railroad. They crossed the North Anna River at Carpenter's Ford and then headed on the Catharpin Road in the direction of Spotsylvania Court House. On June 16 the column passed through Bowling Green and, traveling along the north bank of the Mattaponi River, arrived at King and Queen Court House on June 18.

While Sheridan's men were off on their raid, Grant's army had begun moving from Cold Harbor to cross the James River for an attack against Petersburg. In conjunction with this move, Grant ordered that his principal supply base be moved from White House on the Pamunkey River to City Point on the James. Sheridan learned that the White House depot had not yet been broken up, so he sent his wounded, prisoners, and African-Americans who had been following his column, to White House under escort on June 19, and then marched back to Dunkirk, where he could cross the Mattaponi.

Hampton's Confederate cavalry left Trevilian Station and followed Sheridan on roughly parallel roads to the south. His force consisted of Brig. Gen. Matthew C. Butler's and Brig. Gen. Thomas L. Rosser's brigades from his own division, Brig. Gen. Williams C. Wickham's brigade from Maj. Gen. Fitzhugh Lee's division, and Brig. Gen. John R. Chambliss's brigade from Maj. Gen. W.H.F. "Rooney" Lee's division. He added a newly formed cavalry brigade under Brig. Gen. Martin W. Gary.

On June 20, Fitz Lee attempted to attack the Union supply depot at White House, but Sheridan's arrival relieved the garrison there. On June 21, Sheridan crossed over the Pamunkey River, broke through the Confederate cordon at St. Peter's Church, and led 900 wagons toward the James River. They crossed the Chickahominy River on June 22 and June 23, bypassing stiff opposition south of Jones's Bridge on June 23; Hampton had been unable to intercept Sheridan prior to this, so crossed the Chickahominy upstream from the Union crossing and hastened south.

Sheridan headed toward Deep Bottom on his way to link up with Union infantry at Bermuda Hundred. Near Westover Church, Union Brig. Gen. Alfred T. A. Torbert's division was stalled by Confederate resistance. On June 24, Brig. Gen. David McM. Gregg's division occupied a covering position near Samaria Church, on the road to Charles City, while Sheridan ferried Torbert's division and the supply train across the James at Douthat's Landing.

== Battle ==
On June 24, Torbert's division continued to escort the wagons toward Harrison's Landing on the James as Gregg's division followed a parallel route, protecting the right flank. Torbert encountered Brig. Gen. Lunsford L. Lomax's brigade near the Charles City Court House and drove it back. At about 8 a.m., Gregg's brigade under Brig. Gen. Henry E. Davies, Jr., arrived in the vicinity of Samaria Church, at the intersection of three roads, where they found Confederate pickets. A charge by the 2nd Pennsylvania Cavalry pushed the pickets to the north and Davies's brigade entrenched to the west of the intersection. Davies took up the right flank of the line and Col. J. Irvin Gregg (General Gregg's cousin) the left.

Hampton's force approached and prepared to attack dismounted, while simultaneously entrenching. From 3 to 4 p.m., Hampton's five brigades attacked Gregg's two. The pressure was too great on the Union cavalrymen and they began to withdraw down the road to Charles City Court House, which they reached about 8 p.m. Skirmishing lasted until 10 p.m. One of the Confederates wrote, "The enemy position was a strong one. ... They fought vigorously for a while but as our boys closed in on them they fled and when they broke the mounted cavalry was order[ed] to charge which they did driving pell mell for 3 miles capturing quite a number of prisoners, they leaving their dead and wounded in our care."

== Aftermath ==
Except for the men left behind, Gregg's division escaped relatively intact. Among the prisoners was Col. Pennock Huey of the 8th Pennsylvania Cavalry. Casualties were about 350 Union, 250 Confederate. Having been blocked by Hampton's cavalry, Sheridan withdrew on June 25 and moved through Charles City Court House to Douthat's Landing, where the trains crossed the James on flatboats. His cavalry followed on June 27 and 28. The Confederate cavalry attempted to position themselves for another attack, but the Union force was too strong and the Southern horsemen were too worn out. Hampton received orders from Robert E. Lee to proceed to Petersburg as quickly as possible to deal with the Wilson-Kautz Raid against railroads south of the city. His men crossed the James on a pontoon bridge at Chaffin's Bluff, also on June 27 and 28.

Hampton was brilliant that hot, dry summer. Demonstrating his prowess as a fighter and only slightly restrained by the toll taken on his horses and men, he chased the Union cavalry all over Virginia and thrashed it each time they met. An early Confederate cavalry historian proclaimed that the Trevilian Raid "demonstrated anew that the Confederate cavalry under Hampton was just as enterprising, as valiant, as enthusiastic, and as brave and dauntless as when it fought under Stuart."

— Eric J. Wittenberg, Glory Enough for All

Sheridan's raid to Trevilian Station and back to the Army of the Potomac achieved mixed results. He successfully diverted Confederate attention from Grant's crossing of the James, but was unsuccessful in his objective of cutting the Virginia Central Railroad, a critical supply line to the Confederate capital and Lee's army. He also suffered relatively heavy casualties—particularly in his officer corps—and lost a large number of his horses to battle and heat exhaustion. And yet Sheridan claimed his raid was an undeniable victory. In his 1866 official report on operations he wrote, "The result was constant success and the almost total annihilation of the rebel cavalry. We marched when and where we pleased; were always the attacking party, and always successful."

The results of Hampton's cavalry activities against Sheridan were also mixed, but are usually seen in a more positive light than Sheridan's. He had succeeded in protecting the railroads and, indirectly, Richmond. He achieved tactical victories on the second day of Trevilian Station and against Gregg at Samaria Church, but failed to destroy the Union cavalry or its trains. in August, he was named commander of the Cavalry Corps of the Army of Northern Virginia, filling the position that had remained open since the death of J.E.B. Stuart.
