= Battle of Todd's Tavern =

Battle of the American Civil War

- Part of the American Civil War
Date	May 7, 1864
Location	Todds Tavern, Virginia
Result	Inconclusive (Confederate delaying tactic successful)

Belligerents
United States (Union)	(Confederate States of America) CSA (Confederacy)

Commanders and leaders
Maj.Gen. Philip H. Sheridan	Maj.Gen. J.E.B. Stuart

The Battle of Todd's Tavern was fought in Virginia on May 7–8, 1864, during the American Civil War.

== The Battle of the Wilderness ==
On May 4, 1864, Gen. Ulysses S. Grant's 122,000-man Army of the Potomac and Gen. Robert E. Lee's 66,000-man Army of Northern Virginia opened the Battle of the Wilderness as a meeting engagement. This battle, fought primarily on May 5 and 6, proved costly to both sides, as well as being essentially a draw. As he believed his position untenable (since he had not successfully interposed his army between Grant and Richmond), Lee believed Grant would continue his move towards Richmond. Lee therefore moved to block Grant by shifting the Army of Northern Virginia southward towards Spotsylvania Court House, a crucial junction in the most direct routes from Grant's position in the Wilderness to Richmond.

== The Battle ==
Lee assigned the job of slowing down the Union columns and protecting the Confederates' route to General J.E.B Stuart, a cavalry commander he trusted. Grant's orders to his cavalry chief, General Philip Sheridan, were to cut the route the Confederates would take to Spotsylvania and to take and hold the crossroads. On May 7, the two opposing cavalries met at Todd's Tavern at 4:00pm. They engaged in a slashing cavalry battle until after dark. The Confederate cavalry retired after nightfall.

The battle resumed the next morning. It was an inconclusive struggle with heavy losses on both sides. The Confederates were slowly pushed back upon Spotsylvania. They were just about to have to flee when the first of Lee's infantry arrived, across a bridge Sheridan had ordered his cavalry to destroy. The infantry secured the area for the Confederacy.

== Aftermath ==
Declaring the battle victorious for either side is problematic. While Stuart's cavalry was tactically defeated, Sheridan failed to cut the Confederate route to Spotsylvania, resulting in the bloody battle that ensued there. Yet, the delay caused by Sheridan's cavalry prevented Lee from gaining the advantages that an unhindered march to Spotsylvania would have garnered. The net effect was the continued and eventually fatal losses of the Army of Northern Virginia, at the cost of yet more Union casualties, although they could be replaced with fresh Northern recruits. The Confederate army could not replace its men. Thus, on the balance, the result was very slightly better than a draw for the Union forces. Today, there is information about the battle in the area provided by the Fredericksburg and Spotsylvania National Military Park.
