= Second Battle of Ream's Station order of battle: Confederate =

The following Confederate States Army units and commanders fought in the Second Battle of Ream's Station on August 25, 1864. The Union order of battle is listed separately.

== Abbreviations used ==
=== Military rank ===
- Gen = General
- LTG = Lieutenant General
- MG = Major General
- BG = Brigadier General
- Col = Colonel
- Ltc = Lieutenant Colonel
- Maj = Major

=== Other ===
- (w) = wounded
- (mw) = mortally wounded
- (k) = killed in action
- (c) = captured

== Army of Northern Virginia ==
=== Third Corps ===
LTG A. P. Hill

Division	Brigade	Regiments and Others
Wilcox's Division; MG Cadmus M. Wilcox	Anderson's Brigade BG George T. Anderson	7th Georgia Infantry; 8th Georgia Infantry; 9th Georgia Infantry; 11th Georgia Infantry; 59th Georgia Infantry
Wilcox's Division; MG Cadmus M. Wilcox	Lane's Brigade BG James Conner	7th North Carolina Infantry; 18th North Carolina Infantry; 28th North Carolina Infantry; 37th North Carolina Infantry
Wilcox's Division; MG Cadmus M. Wilcox	McGowan's Brigade BG Samuel McGowan	1st South Carolina Infantry; 12th South Carolina Infantry; 13th South Carolina Infantry; 14th South Carolina Infantry; Orr's Rifles
Wilcox's Division; MG Cadmus M. Wilcox	Scales' Brigade BG Alfred M. Scales	13th North Carolina Infantry; 16th North Carolina Infantry; 22nd North Carolina Infantry; 34th North Carolina Infantry; 38th North Carolina Infantry
Heth's Division; MG Henry Heth	Cooke's Brigade BG John R. Cooke	15th North Carolina Infantry; 27th North Carolina Infantry; 46th North Carolina Infantry; 48th North Carolina Infantry
Heth's Division; MG Henry Heth	MacRae's Brigade BG William MacRae	11th North Carolina Infantry; 26th North Carolina Infantry; 44th North Carolina Infantry; 47th North Carolina Infantry; 52nd North Carolina Infantry
Heth's Division; MG Henry Heth	Sanders' Brigade Col J. Horace King	8th Alabama Infantry; 9th Alabama Infantry; 10th Alabama Infantry; 11th Alabama Infantry; 14th Alabama Infantry
Heth's Division; MG Henry Heth	Mahone's Brigade Col David A. Weisiger	6th Virginia Infantry; 12th Virginia Infantry; 16th Virginia Infantry; 61st Virginia Infantry
Artillery	Pegram's Battalion Ltc William J. Pegram	Crenshaw (Virginia) Artillery: Capt. Thomas Ellett; Letcher (Virginia) Artillery: Capt. Thomas A. Brander; Purcell (Virginia) Artillery: Capt. George M. Cayce; Fredericksburg (Virginia) Artillery: Capt. Edward A. Marye

=== Cavalry Corps ===
MG Wade Hampton

Division	Brigade	Regiments and Others
Butler's Division; MG Matthew C. Butler	Dunovant's Brigade BG John Dunovant	3rd South Carolina Cavalry; 4th South Carolina Cavalry; 5th South Carolina Cavalry; 6th South Carolina Cavalry
Butler's Division; MG Matthew C. Butler	Rosser's Brigade BG Thomas L. Rosser	7th Virginia Cavalry; 11th Virginia Cavalry; 12th Virginia Cavalry; 35th Virginia Cavalry Battalion
Butler's Division; MG Matthew C. Butler	Young's Brigade Col Gilbert J. Wright	Love's Alabama Cavalry Battalion; 7th Georgia Cavalry; Cobb's Georgia Legion Cavalry; Phillips' Georgia Legion Cavalry; Millen's Georgia Cavalry Battalion; Jeff. Davis Legion Cavalry
W.H.F. Lee's Division; BG Rufus Barringer	Barringer's Brigade Col William H. Cheek	1st North Carolina Cavalry; 2nd North Carolina Cavalry; 4th North Carolina Cavalry; 5th North Carolina Cavalry
W.H.F. Lee's Division; BG Rufus Barringer	Chambliss' Brigade Col J. Lucius Davis	9th Virginia Cavalry; 10th Virginia Cavalry; 13th Virginia Cavalry
Artillery	Horse Artillery Battalion Maj R. Preston Chew	Washington (South Carolina) Artillery; 2nd Jeb Stuart Horse Artillery (Virginia)

== Sources ==
- Venter, Bruce M. "Hancock the (Not So) Superb: The Second Battle of Reams' Station, August 25, 1864", in Blue & Gray, Volume XXIII, issue 5 (Winter 2007). ISSN 0741-2207.
