= Battle of Old Church =

Battle of the American Civil War

Coordinates: 37.6444°N 77.2209°W

- Part of the American Civil War
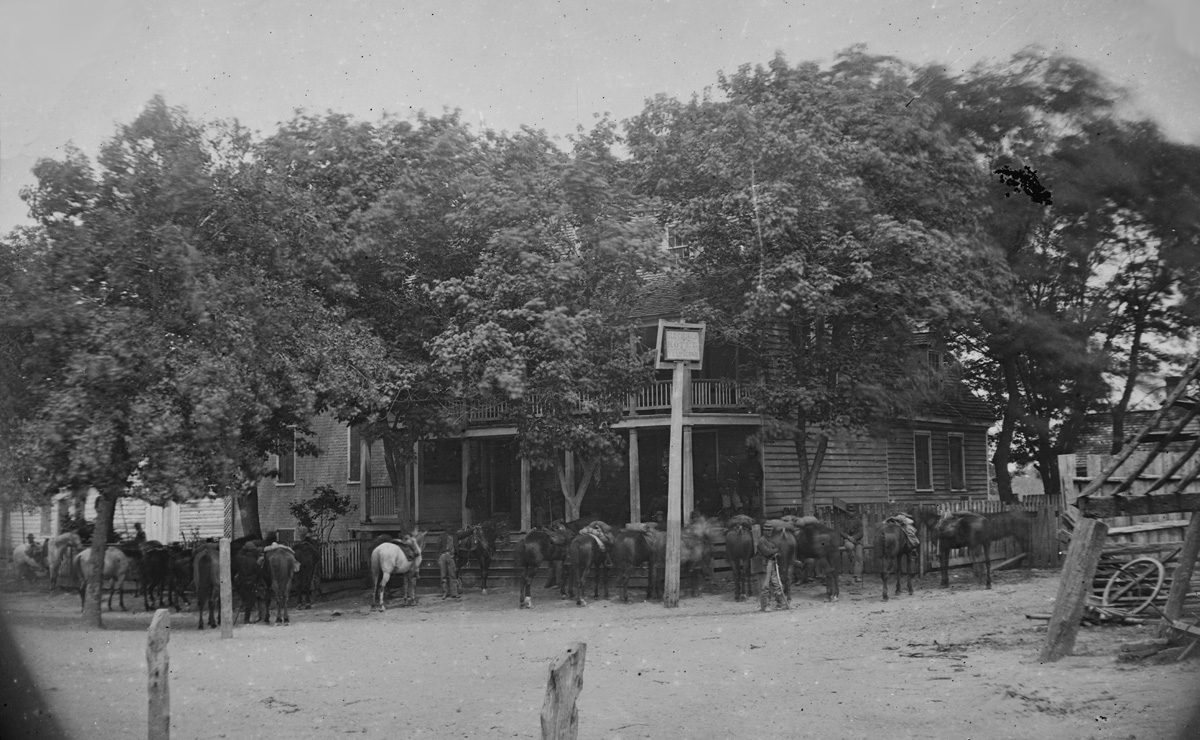
- Union cavalry horses photographed outside the Old Church Hotel by Timothy H. O'Sullivan, June 4, 1864
Date	May 30, 1864
Location	Hanover County, Virginia
Result	Union victory

Belligerents
United States (Union)	(Confederate States of America) CSA (Confederacy)

Commanders and leaders
(United States) Alfred T. A. Torbert	(Confederate States of America) Matthew C. Butler

Strength
1 division	2,000 (1 brigade)

Casualties and losses
90	188

The Battle of Old Church, also known as Matadequin Creek, was fought on May 30, 1864, as part of Union Lt. Gen. Ulysses S. Grant's Overland Campaign against Confederate Gen. Robert E. Lee's Army of Northern Virginia during the American Civil War.

As the opposing armies faced each other across Totopotomoy Creek, a Union cavalry division under Brig. Gen. Alfred T. A. Torbert collided with a cavalry brigade under Brig. Gen. Matthew C. Butler at Matadequin Creek, near the Old Church crossroads. After sharp dismounted fighting, the outnumbered Confederates were driven back to within 1.5 miles (2.4 km) of Old Cold Harbor, which preceded the Union capture of that important crossroads the following day.

== Background ==
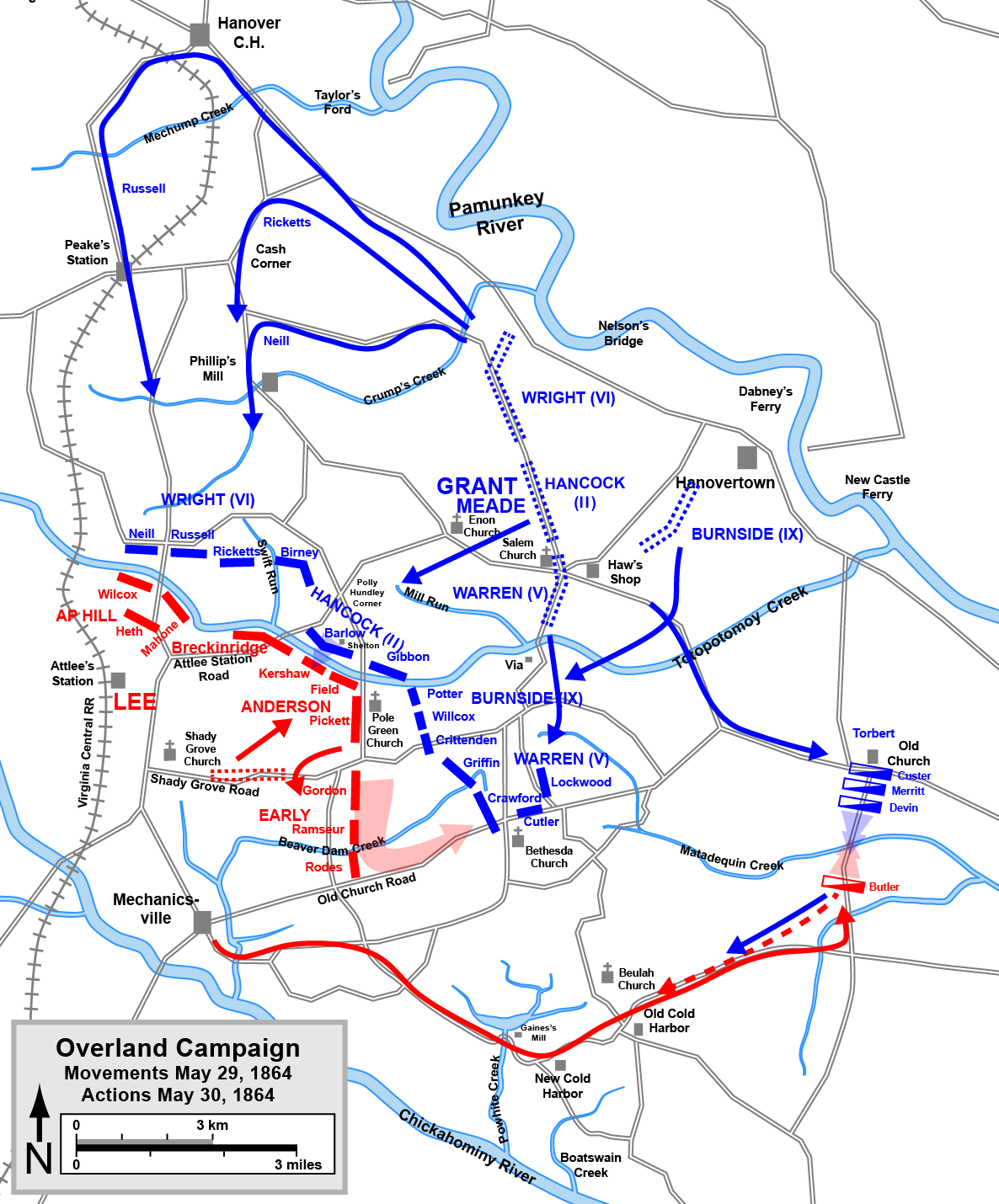
Movements in the Overland Campaign May 29, and actions May 30, 1864 (the battles of Bethesda Church and Old Church) Confederate Union

As the infantry of the two armies fought at the Battle of Bethesda Church on May 30, Maj. Gen. Philip Sheridan, the Union Cavalry Corps commander, began to receive requests for assistance from Maj. Gen. Gouverneur K. Warren, commander of the V Corps, who was concerned that his isolated advanced position on the left flank of the Union army put him at risk. The Cavalry Corps was encamped near the Haw's Shop battlefield, concentrated in the area to protect the road network that led to the supply base at White House on the Pamunkey River and the New Castle Ferry, an area through which reinforcements from Maj. Gen. William F. "Baldy" Smith's XVIII Corps were expected to travel. Sheridan initially paid little attention to Warren's requests because he still harbored ill feelings from arguments the two generals had at the beginning of the Battle of Spotsylvania Court House. Maj. Gen. George G. Meade, commander of the Army of the Potomac, had also quarreled frequently with both Sheridan and Warren and therefore stayed out of this dispute between them. However, as Warren's requests became more urgent, Sheridan agreed to screen roads leading to Warren's left flank, assigning the task to his division under Brig. Gen. Alfred T. A. Torbert. Torbert delegated the responsibility to the brigade of Col. Thomas C. Devin, which was encamped at the Old Church crossroads. As instructions passed through this chain of command, they became garbled. Rather than patrolling the Old Church Road to the west as desired by Warren, Devin was led to understand that he would picket the Bottoms Bridge Road leading south toward Old Cold Harbor. He placed his brigade in a good defensible position on the north bank of Matadequin Creek and sent a squadron from the 17th Pennsylvania Cavalry to a forward position at the Barker farm, south of the creek.

Meanwhile, unbeknownst to Sheridan, Robert E. Lee was concerned about the critical road intersection at Old Cold Harbor, only six miles from the Confederate capital of Richmond. He dispatched Brig. Gen. Matthew C. Butler's brigade of 2,000 troopers from Mechanicsville to determine whether the intersection was threatened. Butler took with him the 4th and 5th South Carolina Cavalry regiments from his own brigade (leaving behind 6th South Carolina, which he considered to be too inexperienced) and the small brigade of Brig. Gen. Martin W. Gary, which consisted of only the 7th South Carolina Cavalry. The Confederate cavalrymen departed midmorning on May 30 and arrived near the Barker farm between 1 and 2 p.m.

== Battle ==
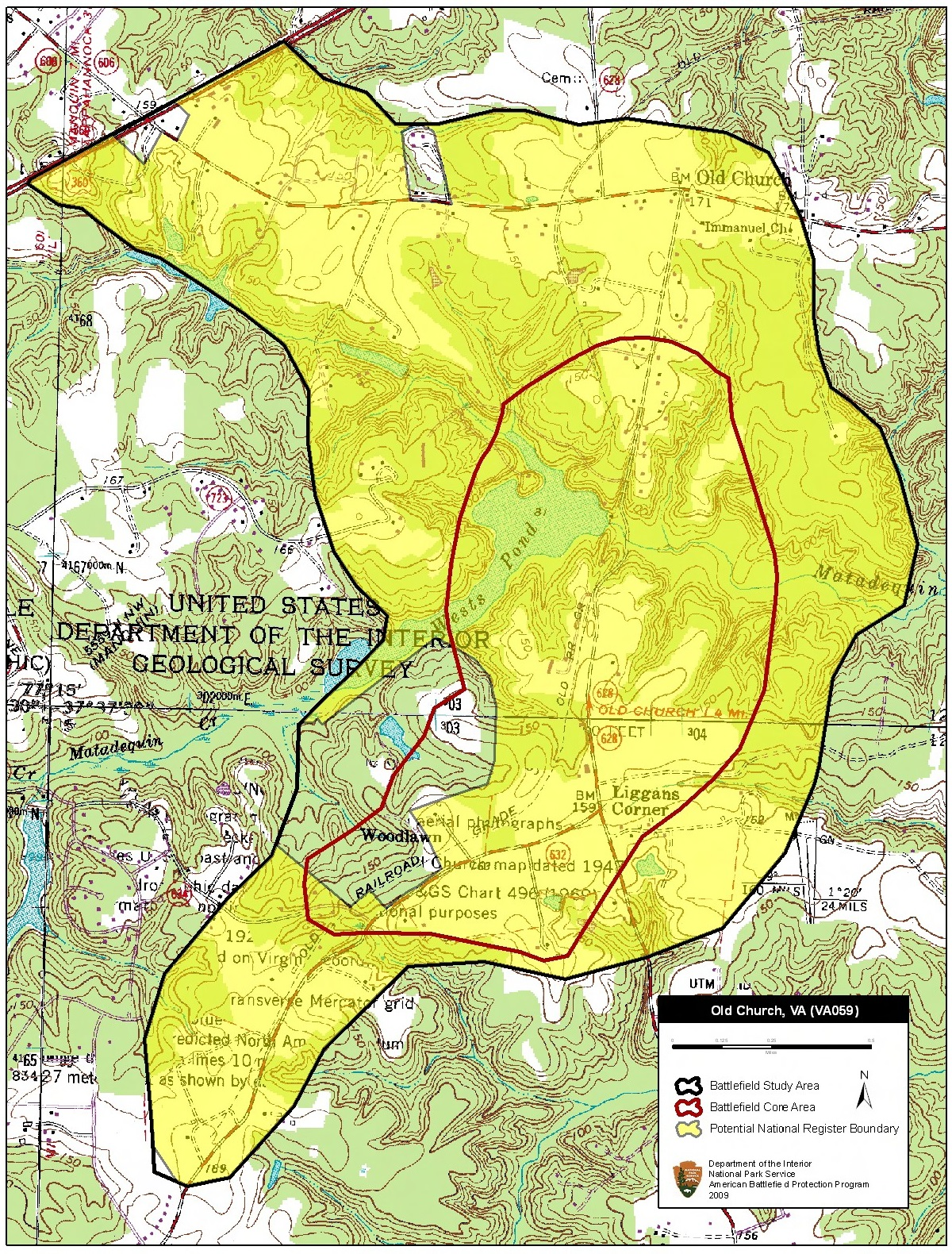
Map of Old Church Battlefield core and study areas by the American Battlefield Protection Program.

Skirmishers from Butler's brigade easily pushed the squadron of Pennsylvanians back to Matadequin Creek. Devin sent in two more squadrons from the 17th Pennsylvania and Maj. Coe Durland led them in a charge that restored the original Union picket line position. Assuming that he faced only a token force, Devin provided no more reinforcements. However, at 3 p.m., an attack by Butler's main force overwhelmed the Union pickets, who fought a vigorous delaying action to prevent the South Carolinians from crossing over the creek. Devin deployed two additional regiments on either side of the Pennsylvanians—the 6th New York to the right and the 9th New York to the left. Butler deployed the 4th South Carolina to the west of the road, facing the 6th New York, and the 5th South Carolina to the east, facing the 9th New York. He left the 7th South Carolina in reserve.

As Torbert surveyed the scene, he realized that three regiments would be insufficient to resist the Confederate brigade, so he ordered the rest of his division to move up. Brig. Gen. Wesley Merritt's reserve brigade was the first to arrive, and his 2nd U.S. Cavalry Regiment replaced the 17th Pennsylvania, which had run low on ammunition, in the center of the line. On the right end of the Union line, the 6th New York and the 2nd U.S. pushed back the 4th South Carolina, which was soon reinforced by the Charleston Light Dragoons. The Confederates built breastworks out of logs from Liggan's farm. On the left end, the 9th New York met heavy resistance from the 5th South Carolina, which was protected by the 40-foot banks of the Matadequin. Merritt attempted to outflank the Confederate position with the 6th Pennsylvania Cavalry, commanded by Capt. Charles L. Leiper. Although they managed to cross the creek to the left of the 9th New York, they were stopped in heavy hand-to-hand combat with the South Carolinians and Leiper was severely wounded.

The stalemate was broken by the arrival of the Michigan Brigade under Brig. Gen. George A. Custer. He deployed his 5th Michigan on the right of Bottoms Bridge Road, the 1st and 7th Michigan on the left, and the 6th Michigan in reserve. Their attack flanked the Confederates on both ends of the line. As Butler's men fled to the rear, his reserve regiment, the 7th South Carolina, counterattacked in an attempt to maintain the line. The superior Union numbers and firepower—the Michiganders were armed with Spencer repeating rifles and Torbert had deployed horse artillery, a weapon that Butler did not have available—carried the day. Although almost all the fighting in the battle was dismounted, Col. Frank A. Haskell and Maj. Edward M. Boykin (cousin of the famous Confederate diarist, Mary Chesnut) led the 7th on horseback, and both were severely wounded during the charge. The 20th Georgia Battalion arrived at the end of the battle and were almost swamped by their colleagues racing away on horseback. The Union troopers pursued the retreating Confederates with enthusiasm. Butler eventually rallied his men at Old Cold Harbor and Torbert's men bivouacked about 1.5 miles northeast of the intersection.

== Aftermath ==
Although Butler had successfully gathered the information that Robert E. Lee needed, for the second time in three days—Haw's Shop and Matadequin Creek—the Confederate cavalry had been driven back by their Union counterparts, and in both cases Custer's brigade had provided the crucial force needed to prevail. Casualties were about 90 on the Union side, 188 on the Confederate. The door was open for Sheridan's capture of the important Old Cold Harbor crossroads the next day, leading to the start of the bloody Battle of Cold Harbor.
