= 4th South Carolina Cavalry Regiment =

- Flag of South Carolina
- Active: December 16, 1862, to April, 1865
- Country: Confederate States of America
- Allegiance: South Carolina
- Branch: Confederate States Army
- Type: Cavalry
- Engagements: American Civil War

Commanders
- Current commander: Colonel B. Huger Rutledge; Lieut. Col. William Stokes; Capt. Richard Morrison II

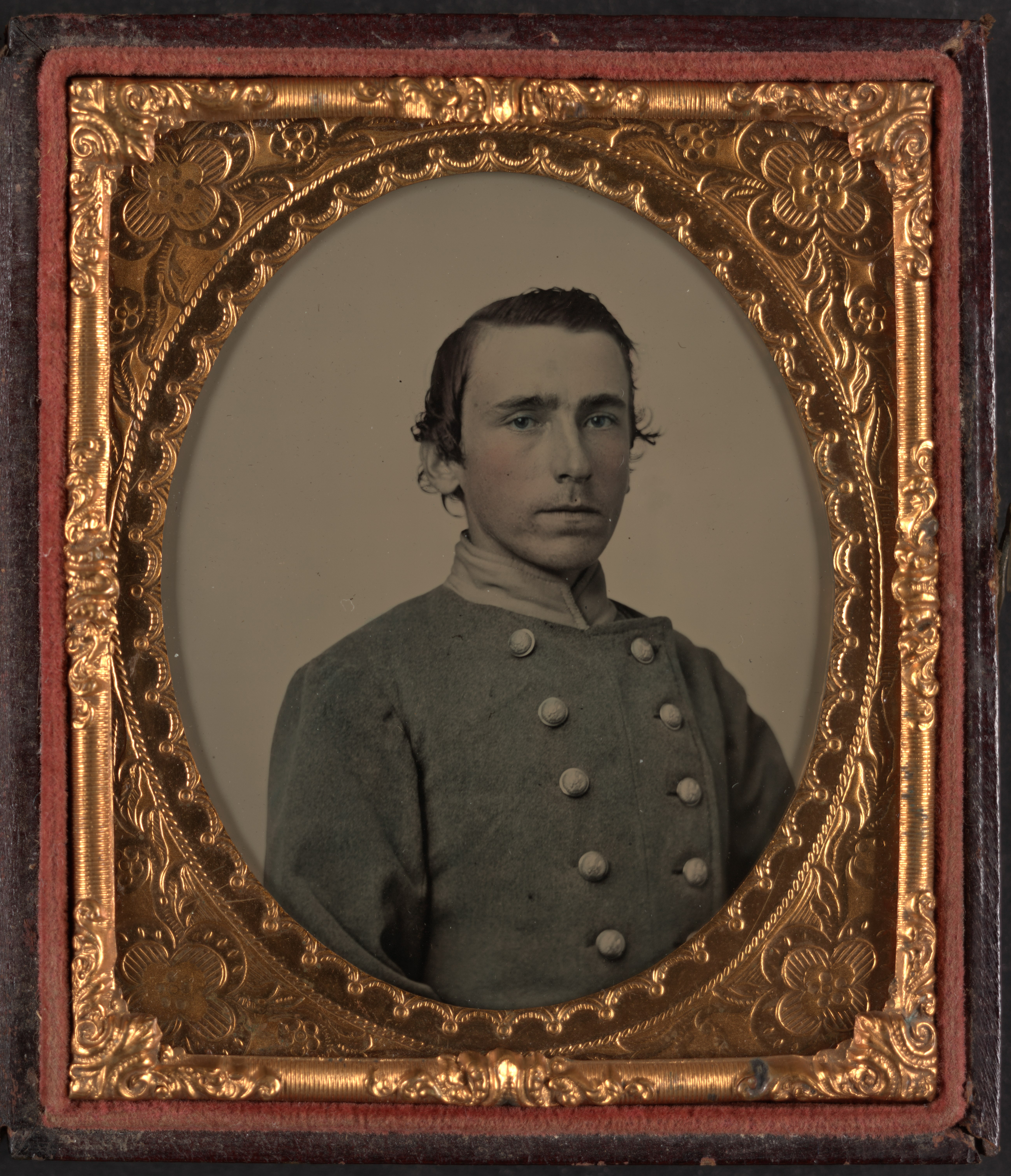
First Lieutenant Thomas S. Nelson of Co. I, 4th South Carolina Cavalry Regiment

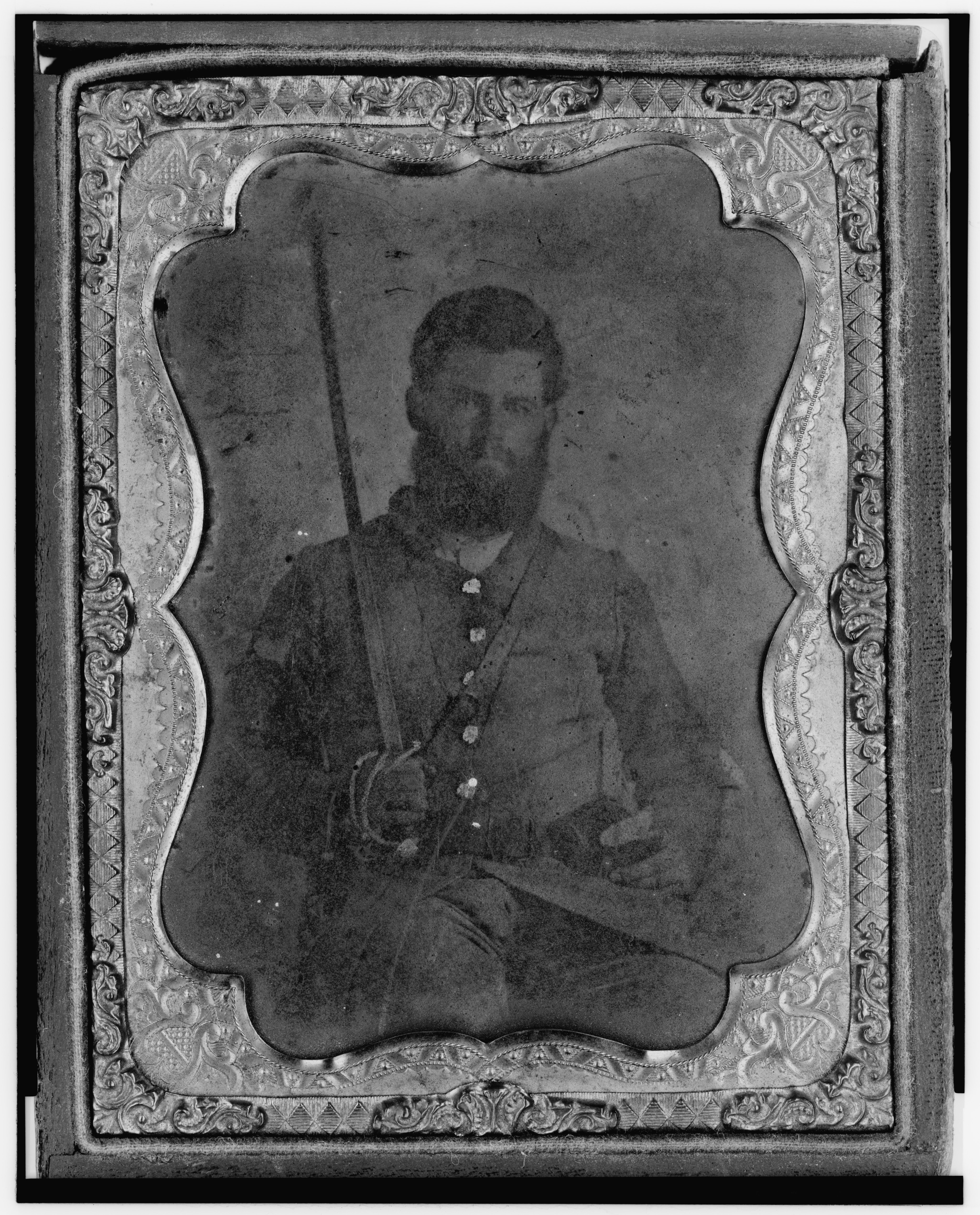
James S. Dodd, Pvt., Co. C, 4th South Carolina Cavalry

The 4th South Carolina Cavalry Regiment was a regiment of cavalry in the Confederate States Army during the American Civil War. They were from the state of South Carolina and served primarily in the Eastern Theater of the American Civil War. The 4th South Carolina Cavalry Regiment was organized on December 16, 1862, by consolidating the 10th Battalion South Carolina Cavalry, the 12th Battalion South Carolina Cavalry, the Charleston Light Dragoons and Company A of the St. James Mounted Riflemen. The 10th Cavalry Battalion (also called the 3rd Battalion) was organized in the spring of 1862 with five companies, and Major James P. Adams and Major William Stokes were the commanding officers. The 12th Cavalry Battalion had also been known as the 4th Cavalry Battalion.

== Organization and history ==
When it was first formed, the 4th South Carolina Cavalry Regiment was commanded by Colonel B. Huger Rutledge and served in the 1st Military District of South Carolina, commanded by Brigadier General Roswell S. Ripley. The 1st Military District was in the Department of South Carolina, Georgia and Florida, under the command of General P. G. T. Beauregard. The 4th SC Cavalry served here from December 1862 until it was transferred to the Army of Northern Virginia in March 1864.

With 1,350 officers and men, the regiment was attached to the brigade known as Butler's Brigade under the command of Brigadier General Matthew Butler, which served under Major General Hampton's Division of cavalry, in the Cavalry Corps, Army of Northern Virginia.

It saw heavy action at the battles of Haw's Shop, Va., Matadequin Creek, Va., and Trevilian Station, Va. Between May 28, 1864, and June 12, 1864, the regiment suffered more than 280 killed, wounded or captured.

In January 1865 the 4th SC Cavalry and all of Hampton's Division were detached from the Army of Northern Virginia and transferred south, by railroad, to the Department of Tennessee and Georgia, commanded by Lieutenant General William J. Hardee, and was under the Cavalry Command of Lieutenant General Hampton. Following the fall of Columbia, South Carolina, the unit, along with the entire Cavalry Command were transferred to the Army of Tennessee under General Joseph E. Johnston, where they fought final actions in the Campaign of the Carolinas through the spring of 1865, surrendering with the Army of the Tennessee with less than 200 men.

Of the seven cavalry regiments raised in South Carolina during the war, the 4th South Carolina lost more men than any other unit. More than 260 members of the 4th South Carolina were killed in action or died of wounds, disease or in federal prisoner of war camps.

CORRECTION TO PRECEDING. Per the book Saddle Soldiers, the Correspondence of General William Stokes (Lt. Colonel of the 4th) by Lloyd Halliburton the 4th SC Cavalry did not surrender. The General's own words were "not desiring to go through the formality of surrendering the Regiment which I commanded, I ordered the camp struck at 8:30 P.M. and marched toward Asheboro, NC. ... At this place I disbanded the Regiment and sent them home." On the morning of 27 April General Stokes awoke to find the teamsters had disappeared with the mule team of the headquarters wagon. He then ordered the wagon burned rather than allow it to fall into enemy hands. With that, most of the records, and history, of the 4th SC Cavalry disappeared.

== Officers and units ==
The commanding and staff officers of the regiment were:

- Colonel Benjamin Huger Rutledge
- Lieutenant Colonel William Stokes
- Major William P. Emanuel
- Adjutant James R. Massey; Gabriel Manigault
- Chaplain William Banks
- Quartermaster Joseph W. McCurry
- Surgeon: Isaac M. Gregorie
- Assistant Surgeon Capers M. Rivers
- Sergeant Major Garland M. Yancey

Most of the companies in this regiment existed previously as South Carolina Militia companies. Some, such as the Charleston Light Dragoons, traced their history to the early-to-mid 18th century, and are mentioned as guarding Fort Sumter in the summer of 1860. The companies in the regiment were:

- Company A - Chesterfield District
- Company B - Chester and Fairfield Districts
- Company C - Oconee, Pickens and Anderson Districts
- Company D - Santee Mounted Riflemen - Georgetown District
- Company E - Marlboro District
- Company F - E. M. Dragoons - Marion District
- Company G - Orangeburg and Colleton Districts
- Company H - Catawba Rangers - Lancaster District
- Company I - Williamsburg Light Dragoons - Williamsburg District
- Company K - Charleston Light Dragoons - Charleston and Beaufort Districts

== Notable battles ==
The battle history of the regiment:

- Black River (Aug. 13, 1862)
- Destruction of the George Washington near Beaufort, South Carolina (April 9, 1863)
- Raid at Combahee Ferry (June 2, 1863)
- Expedition from Fort Pulaski, Georgia, to Bluffton, South Carolina (June 4, 1863)
- Lownde's Mill, Combahee River (Sept. 13–14, 1863)
- Cunningham's Bluff (Nov. 24, 1863)
- Battle of Haw's Shop (May 28, 1864)
- Battle of Matadequin Creek (June 1–3, 1864)
- Battle of Trevilian Station (June 11–12, 1864)
- Siege of Petersburg (June 1864 - Jan. 1865)
- Battle of Vaughan Road (Oct. 1, 1864)
- Battle of Burgess's Mill (Oct. 27–28, 1864)
- Carolinas campaign (Feb.-April 1865)
- Battle of Monroe's Crossroads (Mar. 10, 1865)
- Battle of Bentonville (Mar. 19–21, 1865)

== See also ==
- 6th Regiment South Carolina Cavalry
- Cheraw, South Carolina#Civil War
- South Carolina in the American Civil War
- South Carolina Civil War Confederate Units
