= Second Battle of Ream's Station order of battle =

The order of battle for the Second Battle of Ream's Station includes:

- Second Battle of Ream's Station order of battle: Confederate
- Second Battle of Ream's Station order of battle: Union

== See also ==
- First Battle of Ream's Station
