= Henry Eugene Davies =

American lawyer

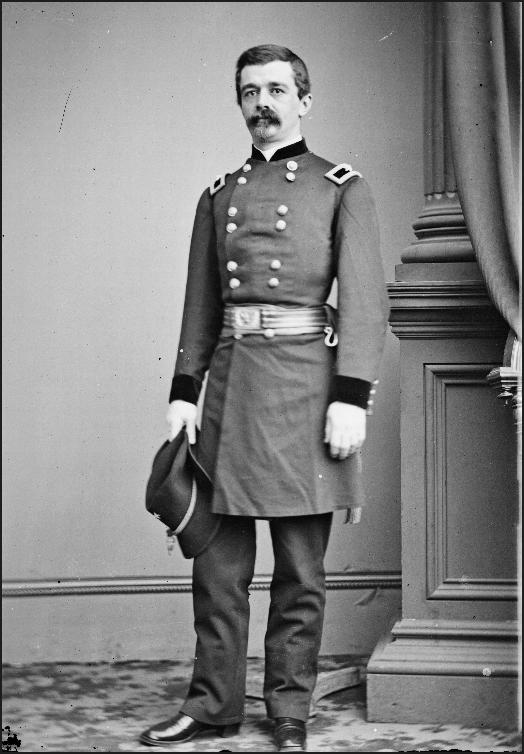
- Born: July 2, 1836; New York City, New York
- Died: September 7, 1894 (aged 58); Middleborough, Massachusetts
- Burial place: St. Luke's Churchyard, Beacon, New York
- Military career
- Allegiance: United States of America; Union
- Branch: United States Army; Union Army
- Service years: 1861–1866
- Rank: Major General
- Conflicts: American Civil War

Henry Eugene Davies (July 2, 1836 – September 7, 1894) was an American soldier, writer, public official and lawyer. He served in the Union Army as a brigadier general of volunteers in cavalry service during the American Civil War ("Civil War") and was promoted to the grade of major general of volunteers at the end of the war. Davies was one of the few nonprofessional soldiers in the Union cavalry in the East to be promoted to the grade of general. He led his brigade in several major battles, especially during the Overland Campaign, the Battle of Trevilian Station, the Siege of Petersburg and the Appomattox Campaign at the end of the war.

== Early life ==
Henry Eugene Davies was born in New York City, the eldest son of Judge Henry E. Davies. He was educated at Harvard, Williams, and Columbia colleges, and was admitted to the bar in 1857. On August 10, 1858, he married Julia Rich, daughter of John T. Rich and Julia Van Voorhies, at Fishkill-on-Hudson, New York. They had one son, Henry Eugene. Henry Davies was the nephew of Union Army Brigadier General and Brevet Major General Thomas Alfred Davies.

== Civil War service ==
At the outbreak of the Civil War, Henry E. Davies became a captain of the 5th New York Volunteer Infantry Regiment and fought in one of the first battles of the war, the Battle of Big Bethel, Virginia on June 10, 1861. In August 1861, Davies was appointed major of the 2nd New York Cavalry Regiment. The regiment was attached to Major General Irvin McDowell's corps on the Rappahannock River line during the Peninsula Campaign. The regiment was heavily engaged in the campaign of Second Manassas. Davies was promoted to lieutenant colonel in December 1862 and to colonel in June 1863. In June 1863, the 2d New York Cavalry suffered heavy casualties at Beverly's Ford, Virginia during the Battle of Brandy Station on June 9, 1863, and at the Battle of Aldie, Virginia on June 17, 1863. The regiment was stationed at the Union Army supply base at Westminster, Maryland during the Battle of Gettysburg.

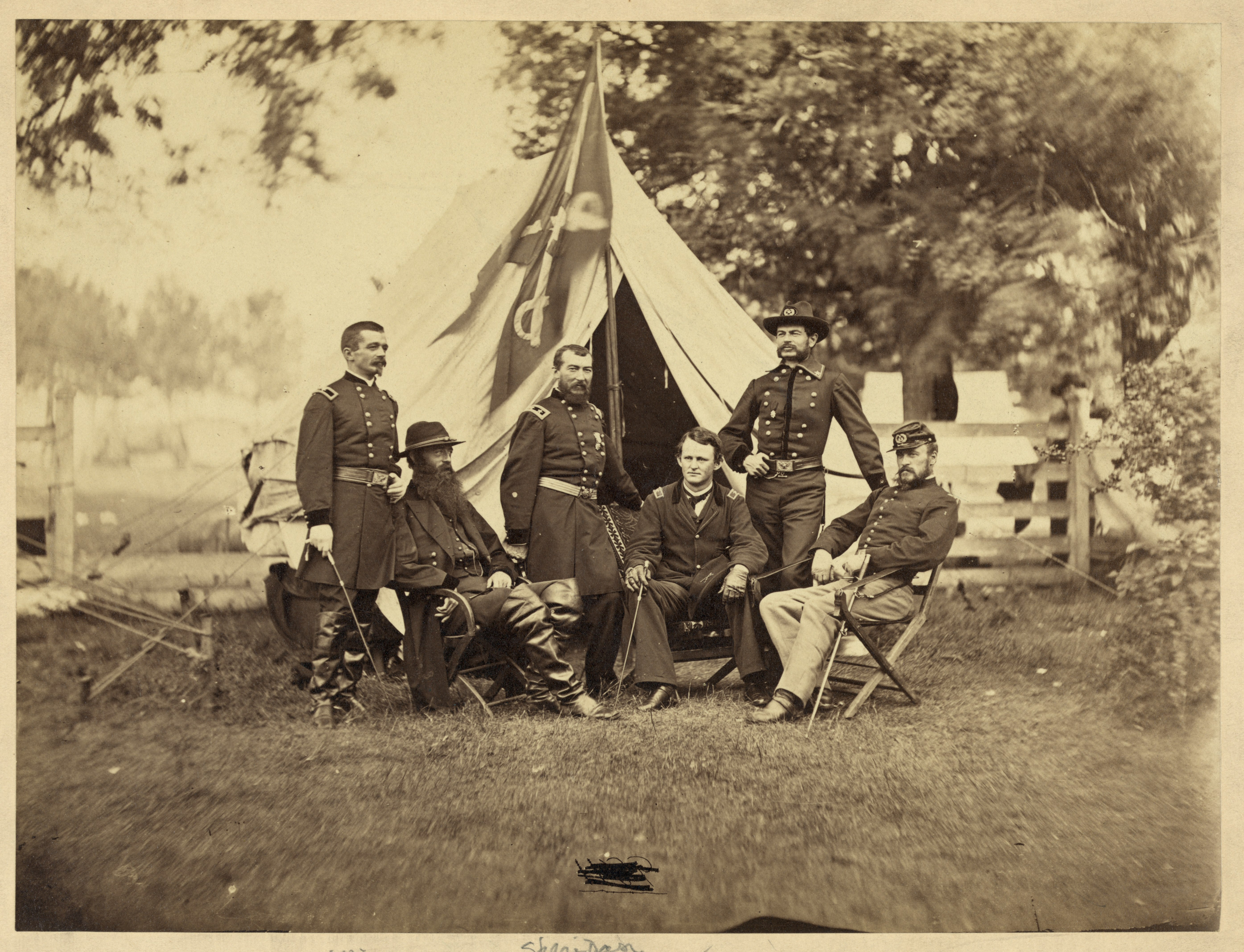
Davies in front of Sheridan's tent

Davies was appointed brigadier general of volunteers on September 16, 1863, although his appointment was not confirmed by the United States Senate until April 1, 1864. He served with distinction in the Cavalry Corps, Army of the Potomac in brigade and three brief periods of temporary division command until the end of the war. Davies was one of the few nonprofessional soldiers in the Union cavalry in the Eastern theater of the Civil War to be promoted to the grade of general.

Davies's brigade initially was the 1st Brigade of the 3rd Cavalry Division of the Army of the Potomac. In late 1863, the brigade participated in the inconclusive Bristoe Campaign. Before the Overland Campaign, it became the 1st Brigade of the 2d Cavalry Division of the Army of the Potomac, commanded until early February 1865 by Brigadier General and later Brevet Major General David McMurtrie Gregg. The brigade included the 1st New Jersey Volunteer Cavalry, the 10th New York Volunteer Cavalry, the 24th New York Volunteer Cavalry, five companies of the 1st Pennsylvania Volunteer Cavalry and Battery A of the 2d United States Artillery.

During the Overland Campaign, Davies's brigade participated in cavalry corps commander, Major General Philip Sheridan's May 1864 raids toward Richmond, Virginia and in the Battle of Trevilian Station in June 1864. At the Battle of Haw's Shop on May 28, 1864, Davies's saber was cut in half by a Minié ball and his horse's tail was shot off.

The brigade was involved in several engagements during the siege of Petersburg, including the defense of the Union position along the Vaughan Road against a much larger force during the Battle of Vaughan Road, which was related to the larger Battle of Peebles' Farm. Davies's brigade participated in raids on the Weldon Railroad in December 1864. Davies was wounded during the Battle of Hatcher's Run on February 6, 1865. After Gregg's resignation in early February 1865, the brigade had temporary commanders, including Davies between March 14 and March 27, 1865. On March 8, 1865, President Abraham Lincoln nominated Davies for the award of the grade of brevet major general of volunteers to rank from October 1, 1864, for his role in the Battle of Vaughan Road during the Battle of Peebles' Farm. The U.S. Senate confirmed the award on March 10, 1865.

On March 26, 1865, Major General George Crook was appointed commander of the 2d Cavalry Division of the Army of the Potomac to replace Gregg. Davies's brigade was heavily engaged in cavalry operations, including those during the Battle of Dinwiddie Court House on March 31, 1865, that contributed to the Union breakthrough at Petersburg and the evacuation of Petersburg and Richmond by the Confederates on the night of April 2, 1865. The brigade also was engaged in the Appomattox campaign, including its role as the main Union force in the Battle of Amelia Springs, Virginia in which the brigade, near Paineville, Virginia, destroyed about 200 wagons of a Confederate supply train, captured equipment and animals and took more than 300 and perhaps as many as 1,000 prisoners and several battle flags. The campaign ended with the surrender of the Confederate Army of Northern Virginia at Appomattox Court House on April 9, 1865.

A staff officer of Major General Crook, Major Henry E. Tremain, stated that Davies's men were "as fine a body of cavalry for their size as could be found in the service."

On June 7, 1865, Davies was appointed to the full substantive grade of major general of volunteers to rank from May 4, 1865. The promotion was not confirmed by the U. S. Senate until February 23, 1866. Following the war, Davies stayed in the army briefly, but resigned on January 1, 1866, while commanding the military Middle District of Alabama.

== Later life ==
General Henry E. Davies subsequently became a prominent New York lawyer and held the public offices of Public Administrator of the City of New York from January 1, 1866, to January 1, 1869, and Assistant District Attorney of the United States for the Southern District of New York from July, 1870 to January 1, 1873. He then returned to the private practice of law. He later moved to Beacon, New York. Davies was the author of Ten Days on the Plains (1871), Davies Memoir (1895 posthumous) and General Sheridan (1895 posthumous), in the "Great Commander Series."

General Davies died suddenly on September 7, 1894, while visiting friends in Middleborough, Massachusetts, and was buried in St. Luke's Churchyard in Beacon, New York. He was survived by his wife and son.

== See also ==
- List of American Civil War generals (Union)
