= John Dunovant =

- John Dunovant
- Born: March 5, 1825; Chester, South Carolina
- Died: October 1, 1864 (aged 39) near the James River, Petersburg, Virginia
- Burial place: Private Family Cemetery; Chester, South Carolina
- Military career
- Allegiance: United States of America; Confederate States of America
- Branch: United States Army; Confederate States Army
- Service years: 1846–1847; 1855–1860 (USA); 1861–1864 (CSA)
- Rank: Captain (USA); Colonel; Brigadier General (temporary)
- Units: Palmetto Regiment; 10th U.S. Infantry Regiment
- Commands: Fort Moultrie; 1st South Carolina Regulars; 5th South Carolina Cavalry; Dunovant's Cavalry Brigade
- Conflicts: Mexican–American War: Battle of Chapultepec; American Civil War: Battle of Fort Sumter; Battle of Drewry's Bluff; Battle of Cold Harbor; Battle of Trevilian Station; Battle of Peebles' Farm; Battle of Vaughan Road †

John Dunovant (1825-1864) was a brigadier general with temporary rank in the Confederate States Army during the American Civil War. Dunovant was a native of South Carolina who had been a Mexican–American War veteran and captain in the U.S. Army from March 3, 1855, to December 29, 1860. During the Civil War, he was commander of the 1st South Carolina Regulars and later the 5th South Carolina Cavalry Regiment. He was in command of a cavalry brigade in the later part of the Overland Campaign and the early part of the Siege of Petersburg. He was killed at the Battle of Vaughan Road on October 1, 1864, during the Siege of Petersburg.

== Early life ==
John Dunovant was born in Chester, South Carolina, in 1825. He was the son of John Dunovant and Margaret Sloan Quay. He was the brother of Richard Dunovant, a South Carolina militia brigadier general, colonel of the 12th South Carolina Infantry Regiment from September 1, 1861 to April 2, 1862, a South Carolina legislator and planter.

John Dunovant was a sergeant in the Palmetto Regiment of South Carolina volunteers in the Mexican–American War. He was wounded at the Battle of Chapultepec. Dunovant was mustered out of the volunteers on December 7, 1847.

Dunovant was commissioned directly into the regular U. S. Army as a captain of the 10th Infantry Regiment on March 3, 1855 when that unit was organized as a new regiment. He resigned from the U.S. Army on December 29, 1860, a few days after South Carolina seceded from the Union and offered his services to his state's militia.

== American Civil War service ==
Dunovant held the rank of major of infantry in the South Carolina militia during the initial Confederate operations at Fort Sumter. During the bombardment of Fort Sumter, he was present and active at Fort Moultrie. On July 22, 1861, he became colonel of the 1st South Carolina Regulars and was stationed for some time on Sullivan's Island and at Fort Moultrie.

Dunovant was cashiered and dismissed from the service for drunkenness on November 8, 1862 but on July 28, 1863 he was given another chance to command the 5th South Carolina Cavalry Regiment. He served the State in this capacity, until ordered to Virginia on May 18, 1864. There he and his regiment were under the brigade command of Brigadier General Matthew C. Butler, in Major General Wade Hampton's division of Major General Jeb Stuart's cavalry corps, which was commanded by Major General Hampton after Stuart's death at the Battle of Yellow Tavern. Brigadier General Matt Whitaker Ransom reported the regiment under his leadership did admirable service at the Second Battle of Drewry's Bluff, or Second Battle of Fort Darling, on May 16, 1864, and subsequently in the encounters with Philip Sheridan's cavalry. He provided gallant services with Butler's brigade at the Battle of Cold Harbor, Battle of Trevilian Station and other engagements in the Overland Campaign and early Siege of Petersburg, thereby redeeming his reputation. He was wounded in the left hand at the Battle of Haw's Shop on May 28, 1864.

On August 2, 1864, President Jefferson Davis suggested to General Robert E. Lee, Dunovant's promotion to brigadier general with temporary rank, and Davis so appointed him on August 22, 1864. In this capacity he had brigade command under General Hampton until his death six weeks later.

== Death ==
In September 1864, Dunovant jeopardized his reputation again while leading a regiment on a night patrol. Challenged by pickets that his officers realized were Union soldiers, Dunovant insisted that the pickets allow his men to pass. He sent a captain ahead to identify his command. It was only after the captain was taken prisoner and the Union pickets began to fire into the darkness that Dunovant could be convinced of his mistake.

Dunovant was killed October 1, 1864 in the fighting at the west end of the Confederate lines at the Battle of Vaughan Road, part of the overall Battle of Peebles' Farm. He was shot down while leading a charge against the Union position. Major General Matthew Butler wanted to turn the Union flank and initially rejected Dunovant's insistence on a frontal charge. Butler finally allowed the persistent Dunovant to lead his reluctant troops in a charge. When Dunovant was promptly shot down, the troops quickly retreated. Union Sergeant James T. Clancy of the 1st New Jersey Volunteer Cavalry was credited with firing the shot that killed General Dunovant. Historians have suggested that Dunovant's rash action was motivated by his continuing effort to redeem his reputation.

On receipt of news of the death of the gallant soldier, General Lee replied to General Hampton: "I grieve with you at the loss of General Dunovant and Dr. Fontaine, two officers whom it will be difficult to replace."

John Dunovant was buried in a family burial plot 3 miles (4.8 km) southeast of Chester, South Carolina.

== See also ==
- List of American Civil War generals (Acting Confederate)
