= Battle of Vaughan Road =

Battle of the American Civil War

Coordinates: 37°7′54″N 77°27′14″W

Battle of Vaughan's Road
- Part of Petersburg Campaign, American Civil War
Date	October 1, 1864
Location	Dinwiddie County, near Petersburg, Virginia
Result	Union victory

Belligerents
United States	(Confederate States of America) Confederacy

Commanders and leaders
David McMurtrie Gregg; Henry E. Davies	Wade Hampton; John Dunovant †; Pierce M. B. Young; Matthew C. Butler

Strength
Unknown	Unknown

Casualties and losses
90	130

The Battle of Vaughan Road, also spelled "Vaughn", was an American Civil War engagement between Confederate States Army and Union Army cavalry forces protecting the flank of the main Union attack on Confederate positions on the western end of the Confederate line on October 1, 1864 during the Battle of Peebles' Farm, part of the Siege of Petersburg. The Union force repulsed Confederate attacks and protected ground just gained at McDowell's Farm and an important road junction on the Vaughan Road at the Wyatt Road. They inflicted about 130 casualties on the Confederates while losing about 90 men, about half of whom were taken prisoner. During the battle, Confederate Brigadier General John Dunovant was killed. Union Army Sergeant James T. Clancy, who was awarded the Medal of Honor on July 3, 1865, was credited with firing the fatal shot.

In the overall actions on September 29, 1864, through October 2, 1864, the Union force suffered about twice as many casualties as the Confederate forces but both sides lost about the same percentage of their forces. The Union forces took some key positions and forced the Confederates to extend their increasingly thinly manned lines of defense at Petersburg, Virginia, and Richmond, Virginia. They did not achieve all of their objectives and did not cut the Boydton Plank Road which was a vital Confederate supply line.

== Background ==
During the Siege of Petersburg, in late September 1864, Union Army overall commander Lieutenant General Ulysses S. Grant planned attacks on both sides of Confederate States Army General Robert E. Lee's works guarding Petersburg, Virginia, and Richmond, Virginia, in what would become the Union Army's "Fifth Offensive" during the siege. In heavy fighting on September 30, 1864, Union forces under Major General Gouverneur K. Warren, Major General John G. Parke, Brigadier General Charles Griffin and cavalry corps commander, Brigadier General David McMurtrie Gregg, seized an outer portion of the western end of the Confederate line, including key intersections around Peebles' Farm. They did not reach their objective of cutting the Boydton Plank Road, a key supply line for the besieged Confederate forces. While the Union generals, including Army of the Potomac commander Major General George G. Meade, planned to protect their gains and possibly to renew the attack to some extent, Confederate Lieutenant General A. P. Hill, Major General Henry Heth, cavalry corps commander Major General Wade Hampton and other Confederate commanders planned to hit the right side of the attacking Union force, which they assumed was weaker than the rest of the Union line. Based on Confederate reaction at the Battle of Globe Tavern, Union commanders were wary of just such a counterattack.

Meanwhile, Union Major General Andrew A. Humphreys, Army of the Potomac commander George G. Meade's chief of staff at the time, withdrew the Union cavalry under Brigadier General David M. Gregg from an advanced position on the Harman Road to key intersections along the Vaughan Road, especially the intersection with the Wyatt Road. General Meade and General Humphreys were concerned with protecting the rear of the Union infantry from attack up the Vaughan Road. The cavalry brigade of Union Brigadier General Henry E. Davies continued to operate at night on September 30, 1864, and took ground voluntarily ceded by the Confederates earlier. Confederate Brigadier General John Dunovant, also operating after dark, then moved directly to recover the lost ground, heading directly toward the Union cavalry rather than around them in order to attack from the rear.

Dunovant did not believe there was any danger along the road at night and actually led the advance himself. As Dunovant's and Davies's brigades approached Armstrong's house, they were surprised to encounter other troops. The Union troops began to deploy but Dunovant actually thought he had encountered Confederate pickets and tried to force his way through the pickets. Then he sent an aide to convince the pickets to allow his force through. The Union soldiers identified the aide as a Confederate and took him prisoner. The Union cavalrymen now knew that Confederates were just ahead. In confused attacking and firing in the dark, only a few casualties were suffered by both sides but Dunovant's men pulled back and he was chagrined by being taken by surprise. Davies now suspected that he was outnumbered by the force in front of him and also pulled back from Armstrong's house to General Gregg's position. General Gregg still was preparing to move forward the next day and about 6 a.m. moved most of his force away from the Wyatt and Vaughan Roads toward the presumed further advance around Peebles' Farm. The Union infantry commanders initially were not enthusiastic about continuing the offensive, however, and their defensive posture surrendered the initiative the next day to Confederate Lieutenant General A. P. Hill.

== Battle ==
In the morning, the Confederate cavalry under Brigadier General (later Major General) Pierce M. B. Young moved toward the positions that General Gregg had vacated and threatened to take the Vaughan Road–Wyatt Road intersection, which was held only by the 1st Maine Volunteer Cavalry Regiment as a rear guard. Confederate Brigadier General Matthew C. Butler regained the Vaughan Road positions as the 1st Maine Cavalry retreated in the direction of the remainder of the Union force. Butler decided to fortify the adjacent McDowell's Farm area rather than pursue the Union cavalry. Gregg meanwhile heard about the Confederate cavalry advance and determined to retake the positions since the infantry action at Peebles' Farm proceeded favorably with the Union force repulsing the Confederate attack and holding Peebles' Farm. Gregg then returned to the McDowell's Farm area and at about 10:45 a.m. drove off the surprised Confederate troopers with little effort.

Heavy fighting then occurred through much of the day on McDowell's Farm, Wilkinson's Farm and the intersection of the Vaughan Road and Wyatt Road. After the Confederates attacked the initial Union force that had retaken the area in greater strength, Brigadier General Davies arrived and sent his men to drive the Confederates back. General Young was outraged at the turn of events and directed General Butler to attack the Union right. Butler entrusted this task to Brigadier General Dunovant's brigade. Dunovant advanced with the 4th South Carolina Cavalry Regiment and the 5th South Carolina Cavalry Regiment but a gap developed in Butler's line which the 6th Ohio Volunteer Cavalry Regiment tried to exploit. The Ohioans were unable to get behind Dunovant's men before the 6th South Carolina Cavalry Regiment warned of the Federal movement. Also being pressed by the 1st Massachusetts Cavalry, Dunovant retreated back to Wilkinson's Farm. The Union force could advance no further under heavy fire and a stalemate developed for several hours. Gregg decided that recovering the road junction was his main task and he need only hold his current position. Not until 5 p.m. was Gregg able to communicate with senior commanders and return to his men's position to execute an attack, which the situation then precluded.

Confederate cavalry commander Wade Hampton saw an opportunity to drive the Union cavalry from their advanced position and personally led the 9th Virginia Volunteer Cavalry Regiment and 13th Virginia Volunteer Cavalry Regiment forward as reinforcements but they were slowed by heavy rain. They arrived at Wilkinson's Farm at about 3 p.m. and found that the reported vulnerability of the lightly held Union right flank still existed. General Hampton was to launch an attack on the Union right and ordered General Butler to attack on the front and trap the Union soldiers in a pincer movement. The plans were ruined when the two Confederate columns mistakenly ran into each other and almost precipitated a friendly fire incident. Confederate Colonel James Lucius Davis did get in front of part of the Union force with the Virginia regiments and took 46 prisoners. Butler hesitated to bring a frontal assault against Davies new and stronger line but wondered whether the line could be turned. Major Henry Farley, commanding dismounted troopers without horses, convinced Butler that Davies's position could be outflanked. Brigadier General Dunovant urged that the frontal attack be renewed. Whether Dunovant urged this because he wished to recover the position he had easily given up the previous night, to further redeem his reputation from the alcohol problems he had earlier in the war, or because he simply believed it the best plan can not be known but the plan was rash and Butler only reluctantly agreed.

General Davies was ready for the attack. Brigadier General John Dunovant was struck in the chest by a bullet while leading the charge against the Union position and was probably dead by the time he hit the ground. Butler's men, who also were in the charge, saw Dunovant fall and were demoralized and pulled back. Hampton sent his medical director, John B. Fontaine, to try to help Dunovant but he was killed by a shell on his way to the general's position. Dunovant's men suffered many casualties in the charge and also soon fell back in good order. Union Sergeant James T. Clancy of the 1st New Jersey Volunteer Cavalry Regiment was credited with firing the shot that killed General Dunovant. Dunovant's death threw the Confederates into confusion and helped gain the Union a victory in this engagement but the Confederates were not quite finished in their efforts to drive off the Union cavalrymen.

The Confederates regrouped for another attack but Hampton waited almost an hour for reinforcements. Then, he attacked without them around 5 p.m. Forces under Colonel Davis and Colonel William Stokes, who succeeded Dunovant in command of the brigade, attacked the Union position three times but were repulsed by the heavy Union fire, including three artillery pieces. Just before nightfall, Hampton sent Brigadier General Pierce Young's men to attack Davies's from the other flank. Young's initial thrust cut off Company C of the 1st New Jersey Volunteer Cavalry Regiment led by Lieutenant William Hughes. Hughes decided to cut his way back to the main Union force by attacking Young's men from the rear. The Confederates were surprised and retreated from what they thought must be a superior force. General Young, who was out ahead of his men scouting, was nearly taken prisoner. When Young regrouped and attacked again, he faced a force which Davies had removed to higher ground near the McDowell house. Union General Gregg had reinforced the position with additional cavalry and artillery. This force easily turned back the charge of Young's men, who had lost the element of surprise against a weaker part of the Union line, which had been withdrawn and strengthened during the delay in the attack.

== Aftermath ==
Overall, during the battles at the end of September and beginning of October 1864, now sometimes called the Union Army's Fifth Offensive against the Confederates at the Siege of Petersburg, the Union forces lost almost twice as many men, but about the same percentage of their entire force, as the Confederates. Union forces had extended their lines but had not achieved their full objectives. They had pushed the Confederate lines back toward Richmond and Petersburg, but they had not pushed the Confederates in as far as planned and had not cut the Boydton Plank Road. Despite this limited success, the Union forces had made some key gains. In the western sector attack, they breached the Confederate Squirrel Level Line of defense and secured another section of line as they moved the siege and trench lines westward.

At the Battle of Vaughan Road specifically, the Union cavalry had secured the Union force's left rear near the Poplar Spring Church and protected the Union infantry from attack by the Confederate cavalry. They lost about 90 men, at least 46 of whom were captured, while the Confederates suffered about 130 casualties in the Vaughan Road and McDowell's Farm part of the overall battle of the Union Fifth Offensive. After the fighting on October 1, Confederate Lt. General A. P. Hill concentrated on preventing further extension of Union lines toward the Boydton Plank Road, not in recapturing lost ground. After further fighting on October 2, 1864, the armies settled into a period of lower activity. The Union siege of Petersburg, where Grant's forces continued to stretch and wear down the decreasing number of Confederate defenders, continued with the Union forces having positions from which to conduct future offensives with safer access to their supply lines. With their limited success in the Fifth Offensive, the Union forces still needed six more months to break the Confederate defense and send the Confederate forces on the Road to Appomattox Court House. General Lee saw the ultimate danger in a letter he wrote to Wade Hampton two days after the Battle of Peebles' Farm (or Poplar Springs Church) where he said that if the Union Army could not be stopped from extending its left flank, they would reach the Appomattox River and cut Confederate forces off from the south side altogether. That eventually occurred as Lee feared.

President Andrew Johnson awarded the Medal of Honor to Sergeant Clancy on July 3, 1865.
