= James T. Clancy =

- Medal of Honor (Army, 1862 to 1895)
- Born: c. 1833; Albany, New York
- Died: December 1870 (aged 37); Remedios, Cuba
- Military career
- Allegiance: United States
- Branch: United States Army; Union Army
- Service years: 1863 - 1865
- Rank: Captain
- Unit: 1st Regiment, New Jersey Volunteer Cavalry
- Conflicts: American Civil War: Battle of Vaughan Road; Cuban War of Independence
- Awards: Medal of Honor

James T. Clancy (c. 1833 – December 1870) was a Sergeant in the Union Army during the American Civil War who was awarded the Medal of Honor for his actions during the Battle of Vaughan Road.

== Biography ==
Clancy joined the 1st New Jersey Cavalry in October 1863. He distinguished himself on October 1, 1864 at the Battle of Vaughan Road. He served with C Company of the 1st New Jersey Cavalry, and is credited with firing the shot that killed Confederate Brigadier General John Dunovant. Dunovant was leading a Confederate cavalry charge against the front of a fortified Union position where Union cavalry under the command of Brigadier General Henry E. Davies were fighting dismounted. Dunovant's death was one of the key factors leading to a Union victory in the engagement as it disconcerted his brigade and led to a delay in further attacks. This gave Davies time to move his men to an even stronger fortified position. President Andrew Johnson awarded the Medal of Honor to Sergeant Clancy on July 3, 1865.

Following this action, Clancy was commissioned as an officer in September 1864, and mustered out with his regiment in July 1865. He died in December 1870 in Remedios, Cuba while working on U.S. civilian military aid to Cuba during the Ten Years' War (1868–1878) against Spain, the first Cuban War of Independence. His burial place is currently unknown.
