= 6th South Carolina Cavalry Regiment =

- Flag of South Carolina
- Active: July 23, 1862, to 1865
- Allegiance: South Carolina; Confederate States of America
- Type: Cavalry
- Nicknames: Dixie Rangers; Aiken's 16th S. C. Partisan Rangers; 1st Partisan Rangers
- Engagements: American Civil War Battle of Wilderness Battle of Spotsylvania Court House Battle of North Anna Battle of Cold Harbor Siege of Petersburg Battle of Vaughan Road Carolinas campaign Battle of Monroe's Crossroads

Commanders
- Current commander: Colonel Hugh K. Aiken

The 6th South Carolina Cavalry Regiment (also called Dixie Rangers, Aiken's Partisan Rangers and 1st Partisan Rangers) was a regiment of cavalry in the Confederate States Army during the American Civil War. They were from the state of South Carolina and served at various times in both the Eastern and Western theaters.

== Organization and history ==
This unit was originally called the 16th Battalion South Carolina Partisan Rangers – Aiken's Regiment, the 1st Reg. South Carolina Partisan Rangers, and Aiken's 1st Regiment South Carolina Partisan Rangers. It was a part of the state militia troops. The men were formally mustered into Confederate service as the 16th Battalion, South Carolina Cavalry on July 23, 1862. The 6th South Carolina Cavalry was then organized in January 1863, using the 16th Battalion as its nucleus.

Some of the men were from Columbia, including several students from The Citadel Academy. The 6th Cavalry saw action at Willstown and Pon Pon River in South Carolina, and then moved to Virginia with about 1,000 men and was assigned to the Cavalry Corps of the Army of Northern Virginia. Assigned to General Matthew C. Butler's brigade, the regiment participated in the Wilderness and Cold Harbor operations and in various conflicts south of the James River. Later, it was engaged in the Carolinas campaign assigned to Logan's Brigade.

The depleted regiment surrendered with the Army of Tennessee at Bennett Place in North Carolina.

== Notable battles ==
- Battle of the Wilderness VA (May 5–6, 1864)
- Battle of Spotsylvania Court House VA (May 8–21, 1864)
- Battle of North Anna VA (May 23–26, 1864)
- Cold Harbor VA (June 1–3, 1864)
- Siege of Petersburg, Virginia (June 1864 – April 1865)
- Battle of Vaughan Road (October 1, 1864)
- Carolinas campaign SC (February – April 1865)
- Darlington, South Carolina (February 27, 1865)
- Solomon's Grove (March 9, 1865)
- Battle of Monroe's Crossroads (March 10, 1865)

== Original commissioned officers ==
- Colonel Hugh K. Aiken
- Lieutenant Colonel Lovick P. Miller
- Major T.B. Ferguson
- Captain Lewis Jones
- Captain James J. Gregg
- First Lieutenant Z. W. Carwile
- First Lieutenant John M. Ward
- First Lieutenant Alexander McQueen, from Chesterfield County
- Second Lieutenant John Bauskett
- Second Lieutenant J. J. Bunch
- Second Lieutenant Henry McIver
- Second Lieutenant Samuel W. Evans

== Noncommissioned officers ==
- George W. Spencer, 1Sgt from Chesterfield County. Departed Greensboro, North Carolina, after April 9, 1865 – Promoted 1st Lt. June 25, 1863
- John B. Strother, 2Sgt from Chesterfield County. Discharged, over conscript age, June 11, 1862
- Hugh Jr. Craig, 3Sgt from Chesterfield County. Departed Greensboro, NC after April 9, 1865 – Promoted 2Lt, June 25, 1863
- John H. McIver, 4Sgt from Chesterfield County. Transferred to staff as Quartermaster, May 1, 1862
- John E. Sellers, 5Sgt from Chesterfield County. Promoted to 1Sgt, June 25, 1863. Killed in action at Haw's Shop, Virginia
- Thomas W. Bouchler, 1Cpl from Chesterfield County. Transferred to Colt's Battalion as SgtMaj in 1864
- Zacharhiah Jr Ellerbe, Cpl from Chesterfield County. Discharged, over conscript age, June 14, 1862
- Samuel H. Roberson, 3Cpl from Chesterfield County. Transferred to Aiken's Partisan Rangers, December 15, 1862
- Nevin S. Smith, 4Cpl from Chesterfield County. Departed Greensboro, North Carolina, after April 9, 1865
- William B. Sellers, Corporal, Chesterfield County. Enlisted June 1, 1863; captured on December 10, 1864, at Armstrong Mills, Virginia, and sent as a prisoner of war to Point Lookout, Maryland; released on June 19, 1865. Walked home to South Carolina

== See also ==
- List of South Carolina Confederate Civil War units
