= 5th South Carolina Cavalry Regiment =

5th South Carolina Cavalry
- Flag of South Carolina
- Active: January 18, 1863 to May 3, 1865
- Country: Confederate States of America
- Allegiance: Confederate States Army
- Branch: Cavalry
- Type: Regiment
- Engagements: American Civil War: Battle of Grimball's Landing; Bermuda Hundred Campaign; Battle of Chester Station; Battle of Swift Creek; Battle of Proctor's Creek; Overland Campaign; Battle of the Wilderness; Battle of Haw's Shop; Battle of Cold Harbor; Battle of Trevilian Station; Beefsteak Raid; Siege of Petersburg; Carolinas campaign; Battle of Monroe's Crossroads; Battle of Bentonville

Commanders
- Notable commanders: Samuel W. Ferguson, John Dunovant

The 5th South Carolina Cavalry, also known as Ferguson's Cavalry Regiment, was a Confederate States Army cavalry regiment in the American Civil War.

== See also ==
- List of South Carolina Confederate Civil War units
