= Cavalry Corps, Army of Northern Virginia =

Unit in the Confederate Army during the American Civil War

The Cavalry Corps battle flag

The Cavalry Corps of the Army of Northern Virginia was an organized unit of cavalry in the Confederate Army during the American Civil War. Starting out as a brigade in late 1861, becoming a division in 1862 and finally a Corps in 1863; it served in the Eastern Theater until the ANV's surrender in April 1865.

== Formation and development under Maj. Gen. J.E.B. Stuart ==
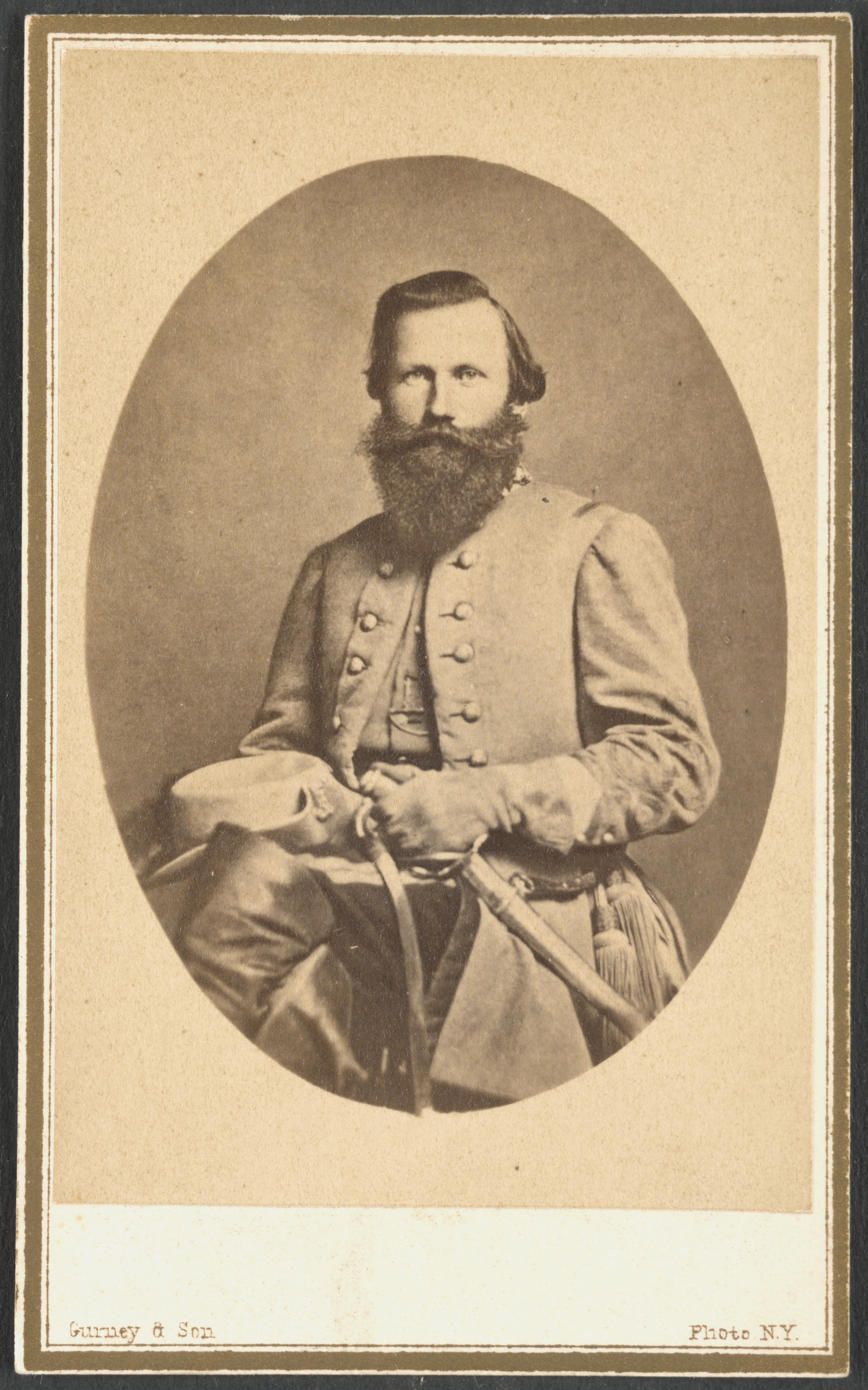
Maj. Gen. J.E.B. Stuart.

The rise of the ANV's Cavalry can be almost entirely tied to the career and organizational efforts of its first commander, Maj. Gen. J.E.B. Stuart. During summer 1861, before the Army of Northern Virginia was formed, the confederate cavalry in the Eastern Theater was limited to regiments or smaller units attached to districts or larger formations. Noteworthy were Stuart's 1st Virginia Cavalry, the 2nd Virginia Cavalry and Hampton's Legion from South Carolina. Recommendations and endorsements from Generals P.G.T. Beauregard, Joseph E. Johnston and James Longstreet led to a promotion to brigadier general for Stuart in September 1861; and the formation of a unified cavalry brigade under his command. On August 17, 1862 the cavalry division was built – swollen to four brigades in less than a year. On September 9, 1863 the Cavalry Corps was finally established with six brigades in two divisions.

Key engagements of the Cavalry Division/Corps under Stuart's leadership included:

- The Raid around McClellan's army (Peninsula Campaign)
- The Raid on General Pope (First Battle of Rappahannock Station)
- Defense of Crampton's Gap (Maryland Campaign)
- The Raid around McClellan's army (following the Battle of Antietam)
- The Raid beyond the Rappahannock River
- The Battle of Fredericksburg: Check of Franklin's attack
- The Battle of Chancellorsville (Stuart temporarily commanded Second Corps)
- The Battle of Brandy Station
- The Raid around Meade's army (Gettysburg campaign)
- The screen and defense of Lee following the Battle of Gettysburg
- The screen and defense of Lee against Sheridan in the 1864 Overland Campaign

Following the death of Stuart on May 11, 1864, the Cavalry Corps was split into two independent divisions under Hampton and Fitz Lee.

== Command under Lt. Gen. Wade Hampton ==
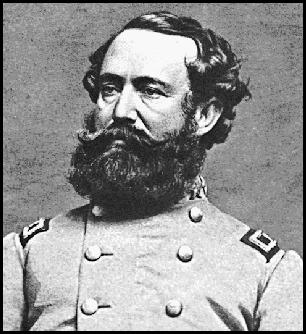
Lt. Gen. Wade Hampton.

The second commander, wealthy South Carolina planter Wade Hampton III, had served as the senior brigade and division commander under J.E.B. Stuart. When the cavalry was split after Stuart's death Hampton continued to command his division for three months until General Robert E. Lee remerged the Cavalry Corps on August 11, 1864, under Hampton's command. He first managed the corps beginning with engagements screening the army along the Pamunkey River in engagements such as the Battle of Haw's Shop (historical Hawe's Shop). Originally Hampton was from Charleston, South Carolina, and continued to command cavalry units from the Carolinas in his division. Continuing in command through the Siege of Petersburg, General Lee decided to release his Carolina cavalry units, including Hampton, back to the aid and defense of South Carolina under the Army of Tennessee, as Maj. Gen. William T. Sherman began his march from Georgia to Columbia, South Carolina. Hampton and the Carolina cavalry units were moved by rail to Columbia, and fought delay-and-defense actions against Sherman. Key engagements under Hampton's leadership included:

- The Battle of Haw's Shop
- The Battle of Trevilian Station
- The Beefsteak Raid
- The Siege of Petersburg

== Command under Maj. Gen. Fitzhugh Lee ==
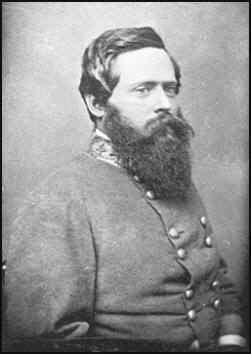
Maj. Gen. Fitzhugh Lee.

Upon the departure of General Hampton, Maj. Gen. Fitzhugh Lee took over the smaller remaining Cavalry Corps in February 1865. He was in command of the corps through the evacuation of Petersburg and Richmond, and through the course of the Appomattox Campaign, until the surrender of the Army of Northern Virginia. Key engagements under Lee's leadership included:

- Defense of Lee during the Appomattox Campaign
- The last cavalry charge on April 9, 1865, at Farmville, Virginia

== Key personnel ==
=== Division commanders ===
- Matthew C. Butler
- Wade Hampton III – succeeded Stuart in command of the cavalry
- Fitzhugh Lee – succeeded Hampton in command of the cavalry
- W.H.F. "Rooney" Lee
- Thomas T. Munford
- Thomas L. Rosser
- J.E.B. Stuart – original commander of the cavalry (brigade, division and corps)
- Pierce M. B. Young
- Rufus Barringer (temporary)
- Evander M. Law (temporary)
- Lunsford L. Lomax (temporary)

=== Brigade commanders ===
- Turner Ashby
- Rufus Barringer
- John R. Chambliss
- Henry Brevard Davidson
- James Dearing
- John Dunovant
- Martin W. Gary
- James B. Gordon
- John D. Imboden
- William Lowther Jackson
- Albert G. Jenkins
- Bradley T. Johnson
- William E. "Grumble" Jones
- Evander M. Law
- Lunsford L. Lomax
- John McCausland
- William H. F. Payne
- William P. Roberts
- Beverly Robertson
- Williams C. Wickham
- Gilbert J. Wright
- George H. Smith (temporary)
- George H. Steuart (temporary)

=== Partisan & ranger commanders ===
- Turner Ashby
- John D. Imboden
- William E. "Grumble" Jones
- Lunsford L. Lomax
- John S. Mosby
- Elijah V. White

=== Artillery & staff ===
- Robert F. Beckham
- Heros von Borcke
- R. Preston Chew
- John Esten Cooke
- Henry B. McClellan
- John Pelham
- James Harrison Williams

== See also ==
- Forrest's Cavalry Corps

== Sources ==
- Anderson, Paul Christopher, Blood Image: Turner Ashby in the Civil War and the Southern Mind, Louisiana State University Press, 2006, ISBN 978-0-8071-3161-9
- Andrew, Rod Jr., Wade Hampton: Confederate Warrior to Southern Redeemer, North Carolina University Press, 2008, ISBN 978-0-8078-3193-9
- Ashby, Thomas A., The Life of Turner Ashby, Morningside Bookshop, 1995, ISBN 978-0-89029-059-0
- Black, Robert W., Cavalry Raids of the Civil War, Stackpole Books, 2004, ISBN 978-0-8117-3157-7
- Davis, Burke, JEB Stuart: The Last Cavalier, Gramercy; Reissue edition, 2000, ISBN 978-0-517-18597-1
- McDonald, William N., A History of the Laurel Brigade: Originally the Ashby Cavalry of the Army of Northern Virginia and Chew's Battery, The Johns Hopkins University Press, 2002, ISBN 978-0-8018-6952-5
- Harbord, J. G. History of the Cavalry of the Army of Northern Virginia, 1904.
