= Battle of Peebles' Farm =

Battle of the American Civil War

Coordinates: 37.1705°N 77.4537°W

- Part of the American Civil War
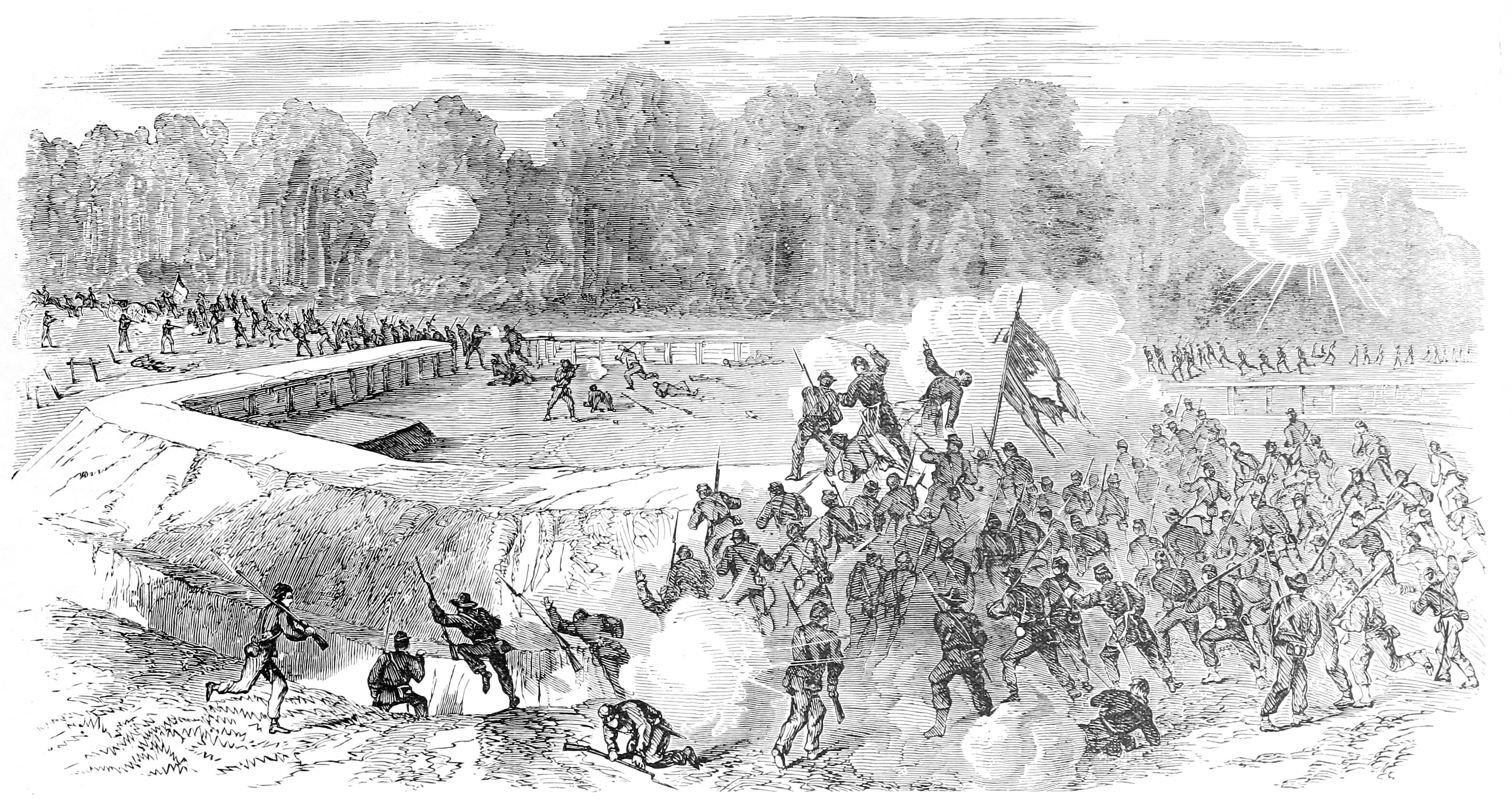
- 5th Corps attacking a Confederate fort, September 30th
Date	September 30, 1864 – October 2, 1864
Location	Dinwiddie County, near Petersburg, Virginia
Result	Union victory

Belligerents
United States (Union)	(Confederate States of America) CSA (Confederacy)

Commanders and leaders
Gouverneur K. Warren	A. P. Hill

Units involved
V Corps	Third Corps

Strength
29,800	10,000

Casualties and losses
2,889	900-1300

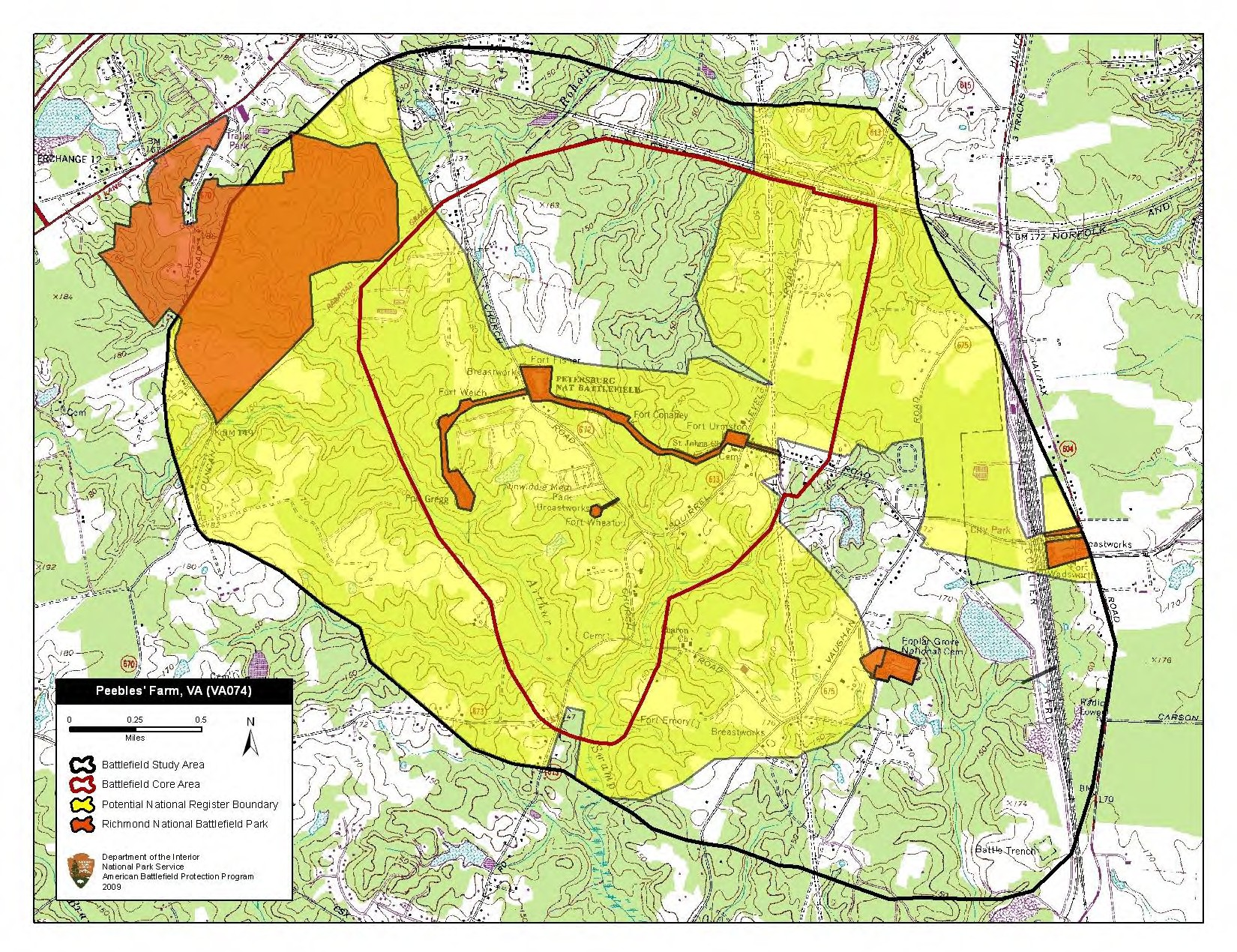
Map of Peebles' Farm Battlefield core and study areas by the American Battlefield Protection Program.

The Battle of Peebles' Farm (or Poplar Springs Church or Poplar Grove Church) was the western part of a simultaneous Union offensive against the Confederate works guarding Petersburg and Richmond, Virginia, during the Siege of Petersburg in the American Civil War.

== Background ==
In September 1864, Union Lt. Gen. Ulysses S. Grant planned simultaneous attacks against both flanks of Gen. Robert E. Lee's Confederate army. The eastern attack would be carried out by the Army of the James under Maj. Gen. Benjamin Butler against the Confederate works at Chaffin's Farm. The western attack was to be carried out by the Union V Corps under Maj. Gen. Gouverneur K. Warren and a cavalry division under Brig. Gen. David McM. Gregg with units from the IX Corps and II Corps in support.

== Battle ==
Grant had two intentions for Warren. First was to attack the opposite end of Lee's line to relieve pressure on Fort Harrison, which Butler's forces had captured and were holding against counterattacks. The second was to take advantage of the units Lee had removed from his right to retake Fort Harrison. Warren's attack was aimed at the fortifications guarding the Boydton Plank Road, which was being used to carry supplies into Petersburg from the Confederate railhead at Stony Creek to the south. This line was being extended to reach the vicinity of the Union flank at Globe Tavern. While the lines were being constructed a temporary line was held along the Squirrel Level Road. On September 30, the same day Lee was attempting to retake Fort Harrison, Warren and Gregg began marching along the Poplar Springs Road toward the Squirrel Level line in the area of Peebles' Farm and Poplar Springs Church.

Lee had indeed pulled forces from this flank for the counterattack on Fort Harrison (including the Light Division under Maj. Gen. Cadmus M. Wilcox) so Warren was marching against Lt. Gen. A.P. Hill's reduced corps. Around 1 p.m. Brig. Gen. Charles Griffin led the attack against the Confederates near the Poplar Springs Church. Griffin quickly captured Fort Archer on the extreme Confederate flank and the Squirrel Level line broke and fled so quickly that prisoners captured were minimal. Warren halted the attack to fortify the new position and not advance too far in front of the IX Corps. The Union attack forced Lee to recall the Light Division from its march towards Fort Harrison (other than Scales' Brigade, which proceeded to Fort Harrison was temporarily attached to General Hoke's force). The IX Corps under Maj. Gen. John G. Parke moved up on Warren's left but did not make an effective link with the V Corps flank. Maj. Gen. Henry Heth was preparing to mount a counterattack, which came about 4:30 and routed the IX Corps and forced one of its brigades to surrender. Warren, who had originally feared a counterattack, now helped rally the broken IX Corps units and check Heth's attack and the fighting died down. Heth tried another flank attack the following day, which was repulsed at the Battle of Vaughan Road, as was a cavalry attack under Maj. Gen. Wade Hampton. On October 2 the Union position was reinforced by Brig. Gen. Gershom Mott's division from the II Corps. Mott spearheaded a Union attack that day, which was aimed for the Boydton Plank Road. The attack easily overran Fort McRae but was checked before it reached the Boydton Plank Road.

== Aftermath ==
The Confederate defenders lost works on both sides of their lines. The Union army extended the siege lines past the Peebles' Farm area, bringing them all the closer to their ultimate goal of the Boydton Plank Road. The Union army was firmly entrenched in the area and later that month the II Corps would make an attempt to cut the Boydton Plank Road.

== Battlefield preservation ==
The American Battlefield Trust and its partners have acquired and preserved 90 acres (0.36 km^{2}) of the battlefield through November 2021. The acreage is located within Pamplin Historical Park outside Petersburg, Va.
