= Second Battle of Ream's Station order of battle: Union =

The following Union Army units and commanders fought in the Second Battle of Ream's Station (August 25, 1864) during the Petersburg campaign of the American Civil War. Order of battle is compiled from the official tabulation of casualties and includes only units which sustained casualties.

== Military rank abbreviations used ==
- MG = Major General
- BG = Brigadier General
- Col = Colonel
- Ltc = Lieutenant Colonel
- Cpt = Captain

== Army of the Potomac ==
=== II Corps ===
MG Winfield S. Hancock

Division	Brigade	Regiments and Others
First Division; BG Nelson A. Miles	1st Brigade; Col James C. Lynch	28th Massachusetts: Cpt James Fleming; 26th Michigan; 5th New Hampshire; 2nd New York Heavy Artillery; 61st New York; 81st Pennsylvania; 140th Pennsylvania; 183rd Pennsylvania
First Division; BG Nelson A. Miles	Consolidated Brigade; Col Levin Crandell; Cpt Nelson Penfield	7th New York Veteran (5 companies); 39th New York (6 companies); 52nd New York (6 companies); 57th New York; 63rd New York (6 companies); 69th New York (6 companies); 88th New York (5 companies); 111th New York; 125th New York; 126th New York
First Division; BG Nelson A. Miles	4th Brigade; Ltc K. Oscar Broady (w); Ltc William Glenny	7th New York Heavy Artillery; 64th New York; 66th New York; 53rd Pennsylvania; 116th Pennsylvania; 145th Pennsylvania; 148th Pennsylvania
First Division; BG Nelson A. Miles	Unattached	4th New York Heavy Artillery
Second Division; MG John Gibbon	Provost Guard; Cpt Mahlon Black	2nd Company Minnesota Sharpshooters
Second Division; MG John Gibbon	1st Brigade; Ltc Horace P. Rugg	19th Maine; 19th Massachusetts; 20th Massachusetts; 1st Company Massachusetts Sharpshooters; 7th Michigan; 1st Minnesota Battalion (2 companies); 59th New York; 152nd New York; 184th Pennsylvania; 36th Wisconsin: Cpt Austin Cannon
Second Division; MG John Gibbon	2nd Brigade; Col Mathew Murphy	8th New York Heavy Artillery; 155th New York; 164th New York; 170th New York; 182nd New York
Second Division; MG John Gibbon	3rd Brigade; Col Thomas A. Smyth	14th Connecticut; 1st Delaware; 2nd Delaware (2 companies); 12th New Jersey; 10th New York Battalion; 108th New York; 4th Ohio (4 companies); 69th Pennsylvania; 106th Pennsylvania (3 companies); 7th West Virginia (4 companies)
Second Division; MG John Gibbon	Artillery; Cpt A. Judson Clark	Massachusetts Light, 10th Battery; New Jersey Light, 3rd Battery; New York Light, 12th Battery; 1st Rhode Island, Battery A; 1st Rhode Island, Battery B

=== Cavalry ===
Division	Brigade	Regiments and Others
Second Cavalry Division; BG David McMurtrie Gregg	1st Brigade; Col William Stedman	1st Massachusetts; 1st New Jersey; 10th New York; 6th Ohio; 1st Pennsylvania
Second Cavalry Division; BG David McMurtrie Gregg	2nd Brigade; Col Charles H. Smith	1st Maine; 2nd Pennsylvania; 4th Pennsylvania; 8th Pennsylvania; 13th Pennsylvania; 16th Pennsylvania
Kautz's Cavalry Division; BG August V. Kautz	1st Brigade [not engaged]	
Kautz's Cavalry Division; BG August V. Kautz	2nd Brigade; Col Samuel P. Spear	1st District of Columbia; 11th Pennsylvania
