= Battle of Haw's Shop =

1864 American Civil War battle

Coordinates: 37.6760°N 77.3118°W

- Part of the American Civil War
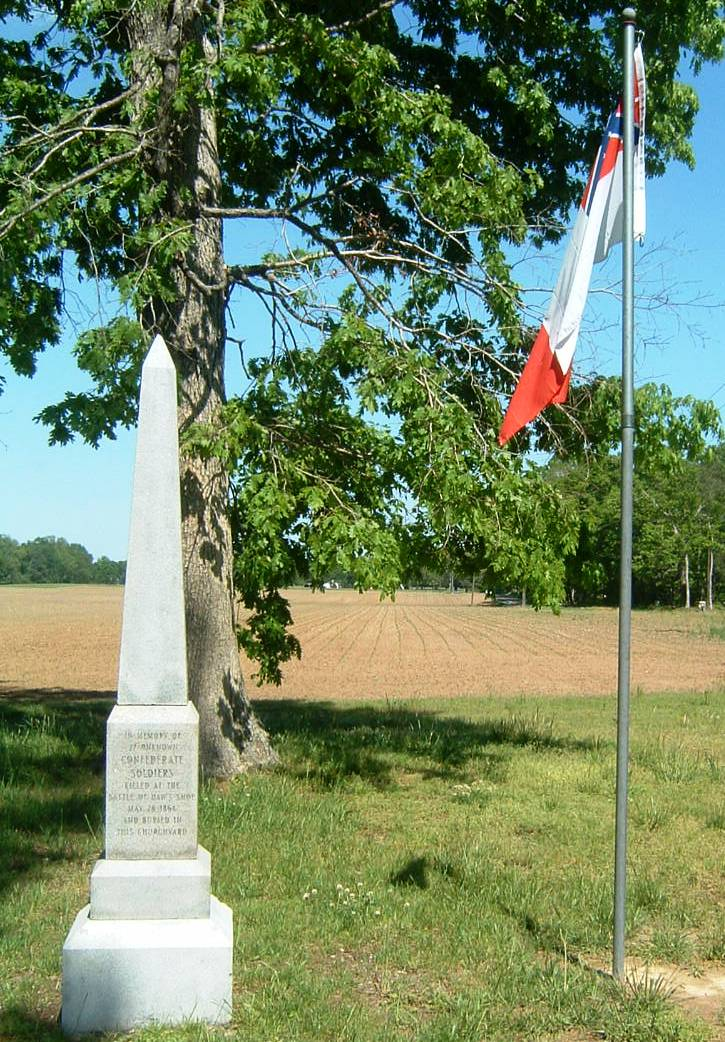
- View east across the battlefield from Enon Church
Date	May 28, 1864
Location	Hanover County, Virginia
Result	Inconclusive

Belligerents
United States (Union)	(Confederate States of America) CSA (Confederacy)

Commanders and leaders
(United States) David McM. Gregg	(Confederate States of America) Wade Hampton

Strength
4,000	4,500

Casualties and losses
365	378

The Battle of Haw's Shop or Enon Church was fought on May 28, 1864, in Hanover County, Virginia, as part of Union Lt. Gen. Ulysses S. Grant's Overland Campaign against Confederate Gen. Robert E. Lee's Army of Northern Virginia during the American Civil War.

Grant abandoned the stalemate following the Battle of North Anna (May 23–26) by once again swinging widely around Lee's right flank, using the Pamunkey River to screen his movements to the southwest. Lee's army moved directly south and took up positions on the southern bank of Totopotomoy Creek. The Confederate general sent a cavalry force under Maj. Gen. Wade Hampton to collect intelligence about Grant's next moves. On May 28, Hampton's troopers encountered Union cavalry under Brig. Gen. David McM. Gregg. Fighting predominately dismounted and utilizing earthworks for protection, neither side achieved an advantage. Gregg was reinforced by two brigades of Brig. Gen. Alfred T.A. Torbert's division, and the brigade under Brig. Gen. George A. Custer launched a spirited attack just as Hampton was ordering his men to withdraw.

The seven-hour battle was inconclusive, but it was the second significant cavalry engagement of the Overland Campaign and one of the bloodiest of the war. Both sides claimed victory. Union Cavalry Corps commander Maj. Gen. Philip Sheridan bragged that his men had driven Hampton from the field and demonstrated the superiority of the Union cavalry. But Hampton had held up the Union cavalry for seven hours, prevented it from achieving its reconnaissance objectives, and had provided valuable intelligence to General Lee about disposition of Grant's army.

== Background ==
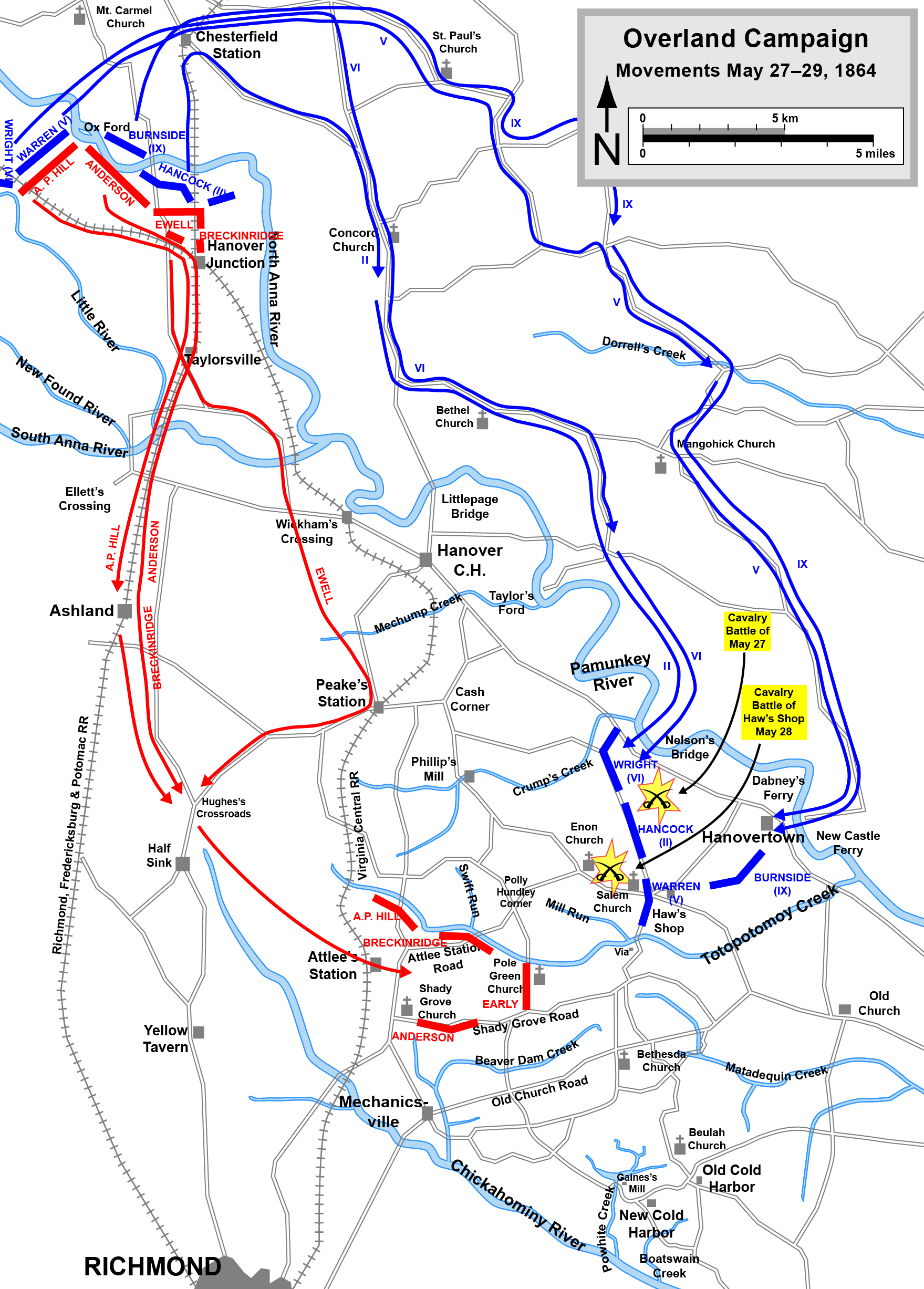
Movements in the Overland Campaign following the Battle of North Anna, May 27–29, 1864 Confederate Union

Following the Battle of North Anna, Grant and Lee were again stalemated in their opposing earthworks. As he had done twice before in the campaign—after the Wilderness and Spotsylvania Court House—Grant planned to swing around Lee's right flank, getting closer to the Confederate capital of Richmond, hoping to lure Lee into a battle in the open. He chose to move directly east and cross the Pamunkey River. If he had moved directly south, he would have been forced to cross three rivers, the Little River, the New Found, and the South Anna, minor obstacles that Lee would have to navigate instead. On the eastern side of the Pamunkey, he was effectively screened from the Confederates and he could also conveniently receive supplies from the newly formed base at White House Landing on the Pamunkey.

Before he could move, however, Grant was faced with the problem of disengaging from Lee's army. Not only were the armies closely situated, Grant's had to withdraw initially north over the North Anna, a situation in which it would be very vulnerable to attack. Grant decided on a series of deceptive measures to disguise his intentions. On May 26, he sent a cavalry division under Brig. Gen. James H. Wilson to Little River, probing the western end of the Confederate line, while at the same time men from the cavalry divisions of Brig. Gens. Alfred T.A. Torbert and David McM. Gregg were sent to the Little Page Bridge and Taylor's Ford on the Pamunkey, 10 miles upriver from Grant's intended crossing points. Lee, who was still in his tent suffering from the diarrhea that had incapacitated him during the North Anna battle, was fooled by Grant's actions and assumed that the Union general would be moving west for the first time in the campaign.

The Union infantry withdrew stealthily after dark on May 26 and by the morning of May 27 all were safely north of the North Anna. The IX Corps under Maj. Gen. Ambrose Burnside and the II Corps under Maj. Gen. Winfield S. Hancock stayed in place to guard the river crossings while the V Corps under Maj. Gen. Gouverneur K. Warren and the VI Corps under Maj. Gen. Horatio G. Wright, led by Maj. Gen. Philip Sheridan's cavalry, began their march toward crossings near Hanovertown, about 34 miles to the southeast.

Once Lee recognized that his opponent had departed, he moved his army swiftly in response. His three corps under Maj. Gen. Richard H. Anderson and Lt. Gens. Richard S. Ewell and A.P. Hill marched south along the Richmond, Fredericksburg, and Potomac Railroad, and then overland, heading for Atlee's Station on the Virginia Central Railroad, a point only 9 miles north of Richmond. There, his men would be well-positioned behind a stream known as Totopotomoy Creek to defend against Grant if he moved against the railroads or Richmond. He also sent a small brigade of North Carolina and Virginia cavalry down the southern bank of the Pamunkey to scout and harass the Union advance wherever possible. During the march, Lee's illness forced him to ride in a carriage. Ewell was also laid up with a similar illness and rode in an ambulance; his condition was serious enough that he was temporarily replaced in command by Maj. Gen. Jubal Early.

On May 27, Union cavalry established a bridgehead over Dabney's Ford on the south side of the Pamunkey River. Brig. Gen. George A. Custer's Michigan cavalry brigade scattered the mounted Confederate pickets guarding the ford and an engineer regiment constructed a pontoon bridge. Custer's men fought a brisk engagement north of Salem Church against Confederate cavalry under Maj. Gen. Fitzhugh Lee, the 1st Maryland under Col. Bradley T. Johnson and the brigade of North Carolinians under Col. John A. Baker. The Confederates withdrew under the pressure of superior numbers. The rest of Torbert's division then crossed the river, followed by Gregg's cavalry division and a division of Union infantry.

Lee knew that his best defensive position against Grant would be the low ridge on the southern bank of Totopotomoy Creek, but he was not certain of Grant's specific plans; if Grant was not intending to cross the Pamunkey in force at Hanovertown, the Union army could outflank him and head directly to Richmond. Lee ordered cavalry under Maj. Gen. Wade Hampton to make a reconnaissance in force, break through the Union cavalry screen, and find the Union infantry.

Commanders at Haw's Shop
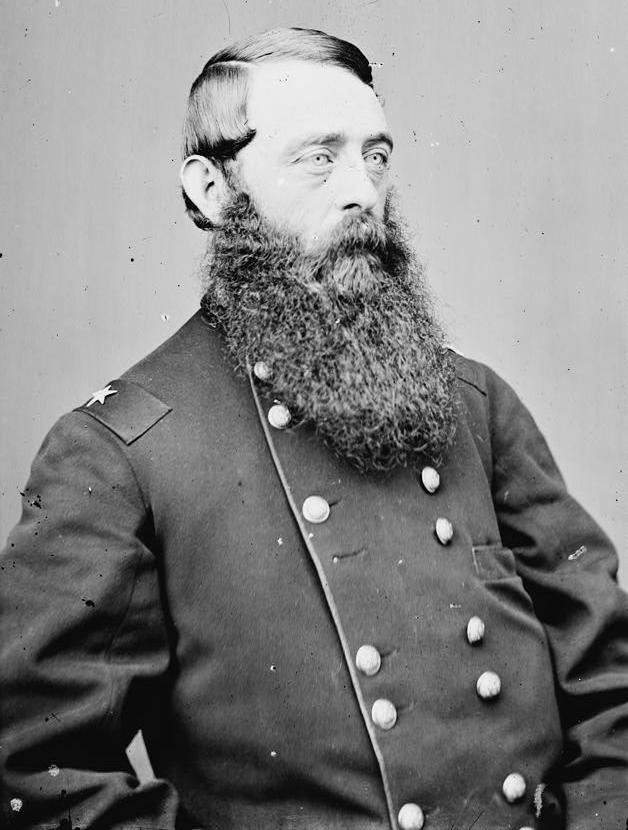
Brig. Gen.
David McMurtrie Gregg, USA

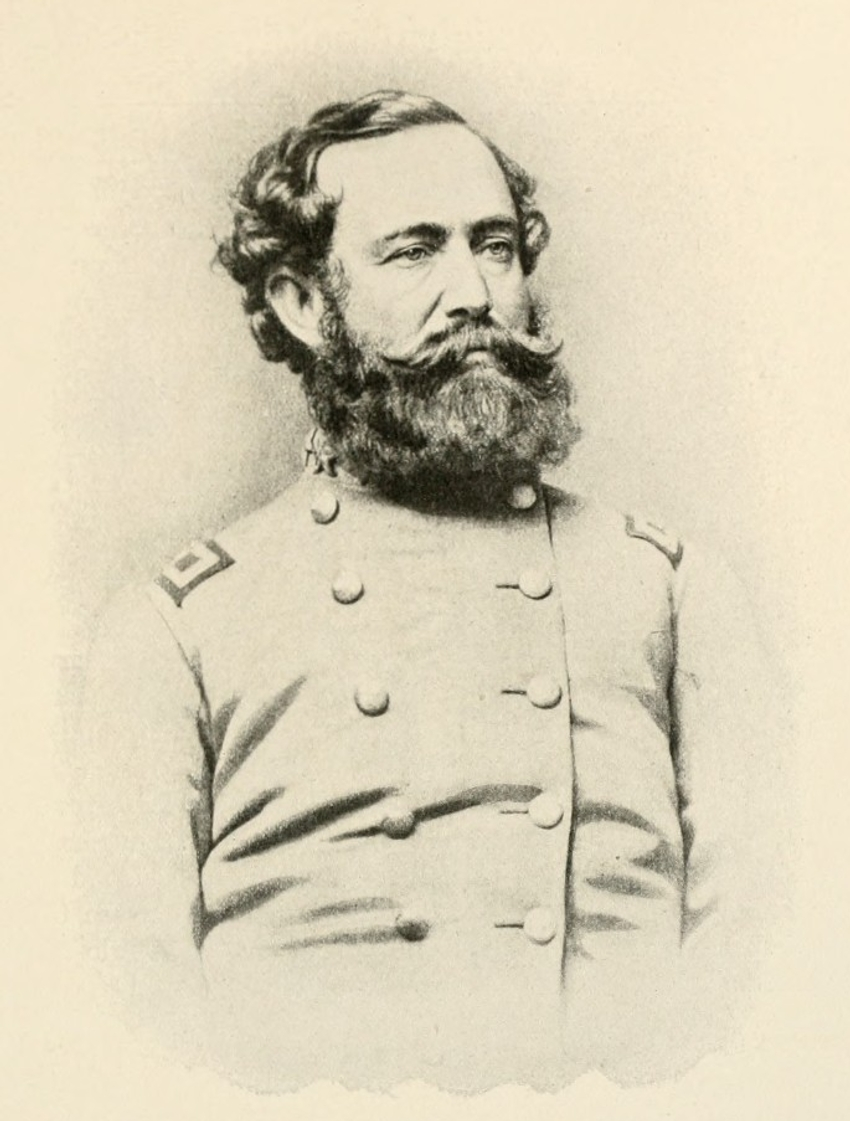
Maj. Gen.
Wade Hampton, CSA

=== Opposing forces ===
Wade Hampton, who was one of the two leading candidates to succeed the late Maj. Gen. J.E.B. Stuart in command of the Cavalry Corps, brought with him his Laurel Brigade, commanded by Brig. Gen. Thomas L. Rosser. The other leading candidate, Maj. Gen. Fitzhugh Lee, accompanied Brig. Gen. Williams C. Wickham's brigade. The rest of Hampton's task force consisted of a brigade under Brig. Gen. John R. Chambliss and elements of Col. John A. Baker's brigade (both from Maj. Gen. W.H.F. "Rooney" Lee's division), a new brigade under Brig. Gen. Matthew C. Butler (the newly formed and inexperienced 4th and 5th South Carolina cavalry regiments, commanded temporarily by Col. B. Huger Rutledge, and the 20th Georgia Battalion under Lt. Col. John M. Millen), and several sections of horse artillery.

The Union cavalry force headed directly for Hampton's was the 2nd Division under Brig. Gen. David McM. Gregg, which consisted of two brigades under Brig. Gen. Henry E. Davies, Jr., and Col. J. Irvin Gregg (David's cousin). Reinforcements would arrive later in the battle from the division of Brig. Gen. Alfred T.A. Torbert: the brigades of Brig. Gens. George A. Custer and Wesley Merritt, and a regiment from the brigade of Col. Thomas C. Devin.

== Battle ==
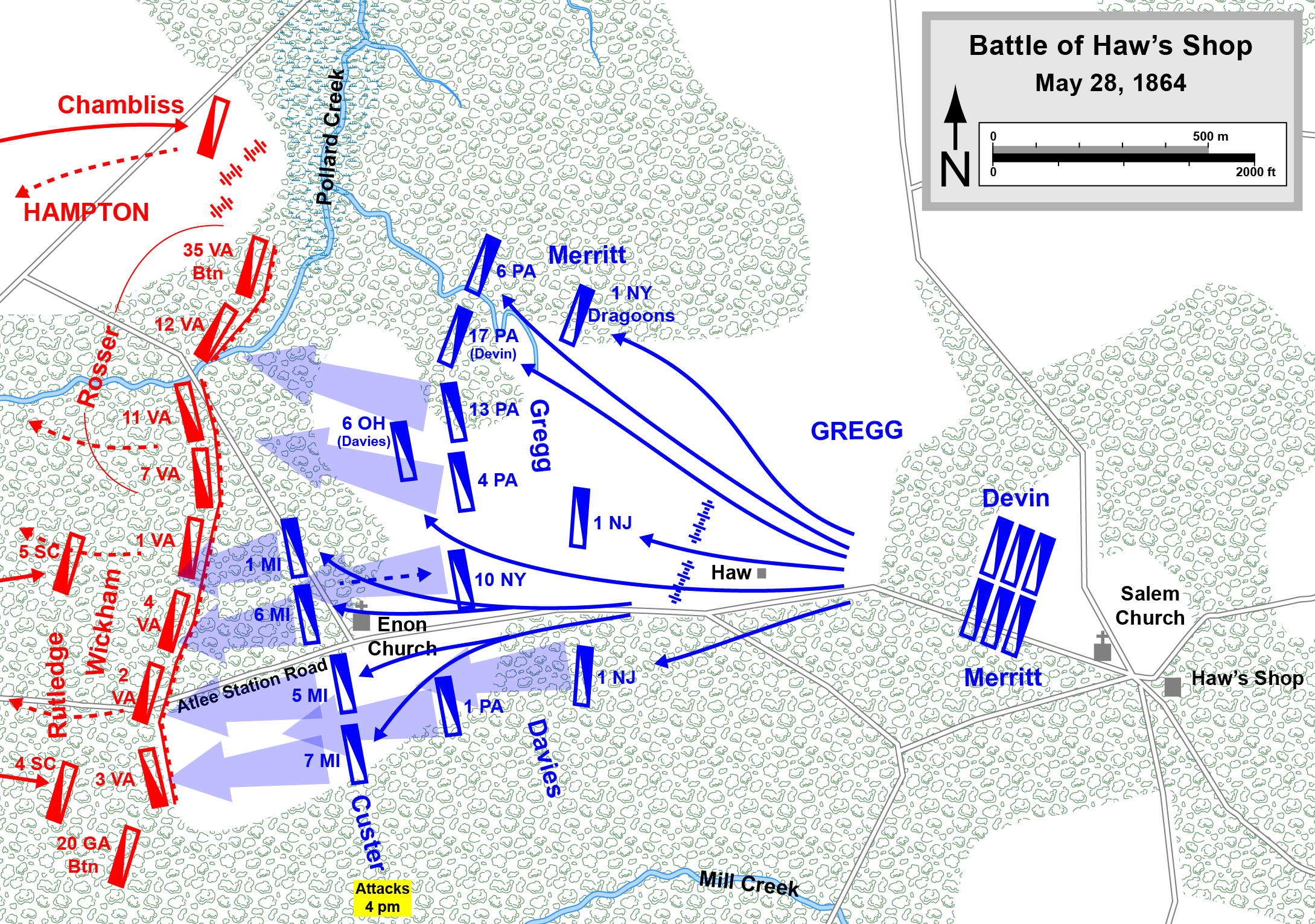
Battle of Haw's Shop

At 8 a.m. on May 28, Hampton rode off from Atlee's Station. As more of Grant's infantry crossed the pontoon bridge over the Pamunkey, Gregg led his cavalry division probing west from Hanovertown, searching for Lee, while Torbert's division began to picket along Crump's Creek in the direction of Hanover Court House. Three miles west of Hanovertown, and a mile beyond a large blacksmith shop called Haw's Shop, Gregg's troopers ran into Hampton at Enon Church, finding the Confederate cavalrymen dismounted in a wooded area, hurriedly erecting breastworks made of logs and rails, and well covered by artillery. Davies deployed pickets from the 10th New York Cavalry to Hampton's front, but the 2nd Virginia Cavalry, Hampton's leading element, drove the picket line back. The Confederates deployed in line with Wickham's four Virginia regiments deployed in the woods behind Enon Church, with Rosser's men and the horse artillery to their left. They dug shallow rifle pits and faced them with log and fence-rail breastworks. Because of a swampy tributary of Crump Creek to the north and Mill Creek to the south, it was impossible to turn the position. Hampton viewed the outnumbered Union force and reportedly exclaimed, "We've got the Yankees where we want them now."

Before Hampton could attack, Irvin Gregg's brigade arrived and moved to the right of Davies's men, extending his flank. Two batteries of Union horse artillery set up just west of the Haw house, "Oak Grove". A Confederate mounted charge, followed by dismounted troopers, was repulsed by the 1st Pennsylvania Cavalry, but the Pennsylvanians were soon flanked on both sides. Dismounted men from the 1st New Jersey came to their aid and the lines were stabilized. Hampton fed in the green troops of the 4th South Carolina on his right and they met Davies's next charge with a wall of fire. These Confederates carried Enfield rifles, which had firing ranges superior to the carbines carried by the Federal cavalry, killing or wounding 256 men. As Davies rode into the fighting, his saber was cut in half by a Minié ball and his horse's tail was shot off. Union return fire was heavy as well, because the troopers were armed with seven-shot Spencer repeating carbines. One Pennsylvania trooper estimated that the 200 men in his unit fired 18,000 rounds. Their carbines got so hot that from time to time the men had to pause to let them cool.

As Davies's first attack ground to a halt, and the attack of Irvin Gregg's brigade failed to dislodge the Confederates, David Gregg sent for reinforcements from Sheridan, who released two brigades from Torbert's division. Torbert's reserve brigade under Brig. Gen. Wesley Merritt extended Gregg's line to the right, thwarting a flanking maneuver attempted by Hampton with Chambliss's newly arrived brigade.

There was plenty of infantry nearby that could have been called for reinforcements, with Maj. Gen. Winfield S. Hancock's II Corps dug in about one mile to the north. There is no documentary evidence that Sheridan requested such assistance, although he claimed years later in his memoirs that he asked for two brigades from Army of the Potomac commander Maj. Gen. George G. Meade, who supposedly refused the request, claiming that Hancock's men were too "weary."

Torbert's other brigade, under Brig. Gen. George A. Custer, arrived about 4 p.m. Custer's men dismounted and deployed in a long, double-ranked line of battle, as if they were infantrymen. However, Custer inspired his men by staying mounted as he led them forward, waving his hat in full view of the enemy, while his brigade band played Yankee Doodle. Receiving heavy rifle and artillery fire, 41 of the Union cavalrymen fell in the attack, as did Custer's horse—the seventh time the flamboyant general lost a horse during the war. Custer later claimed that his brigade's loss at Haw's Shop was "greater than in any other engagement of the campaign." Meanwhile, on the northern end of the battle, a Confederate mistakenly identified some dismounted Union cavalrymen as infantry and reported this to Hampton. Concerned that his cavalry command would be isolated and overwhelmed by an infantry attack, Hampton gave the order to begin withdrawing. (Hampton had also just received intelligence from prisoners on the location of two Union corps that had crossed the Pamunkey, which meant that his reconnaissance mission had been successfully completed.)

The Confederate brigades withdrew from north to south. Once Chambliss, Rosser, and Wickham had departed, Rutledge and the 20th Georgia Battalion were uncovered. Custer took advantage of the situation by charging forward, overrunning the Georgians, killing their commander, Lt. Col. John M. Millen, and capturing many of his men. Davies's brigade joined the attack and the remaining Confederate line fell apart into a rout, but by nightfall Hampton's cavalry was safely west of Totopotomoy Creek.

== Aftermath ==
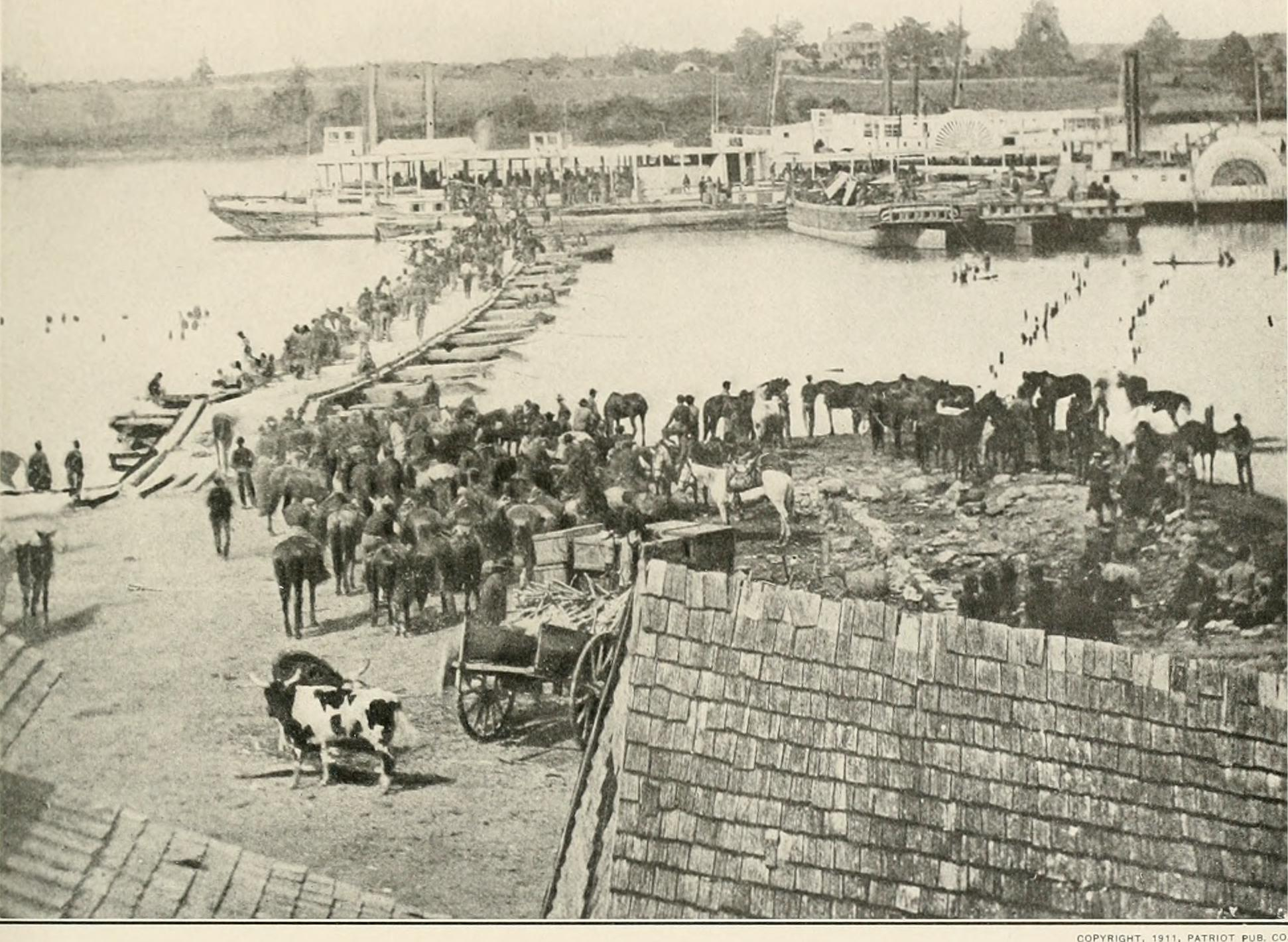
Pamunkey pontoon bridge crossing by Federal cavalry, May 30, 1864

The Battle of Haw's Shop lasted for over seven hours and was the bloodiest cavalry battle since Brandy Station in 1863. It was an unusual battle in comparison to previous cavalry engagements in the Eastern Theater because it was fought predominantly by dismounted cavalry, many of which were protected by earthworks.

Union casualties were 256 men in Gregg's division and another 41 from Custer's brigade, including Private John Huff, the cavalryman from the 5th Michigan who had fatally shot Maj. Gen. J.E.B. Stuart at Yellow Tavern. Confederate losses were never tabulated officially, but Union reports claimed they buried 187 enemy bodies after the battle, recovered 40 to 50 wounded men, and captured 80 South Carolinians. Gregg paid tribute to the Confederates "who resisted with courage and desperation unsurpassed." He later wrote that the battle "has always been regarded by the Second Division as one of its severest."

Both sides claimed victory. Sheridan bragged that his men had driven Hampton from the field and had once again demonstrated their superiority over the Confederate cavalry. He has been criticized by historians such as Gordon Rhea for missing an opportunity to destroy Hampton's command while it was isolated and vulnerable in front of the Totopotomoy, something that could have been accomplished if Sheridan had devoted his entire Cavalry Corps to the task. And rather than attempting to maneuver on several of the roads that led to Hampton's rear, Sheridan's command expended their efforts on costly frontal assaults.

Hampton's claim of victory was also credible. He had prevented Sheridan from learning the disposition of Lee's army while delaying the Union advance for seven hours. And General Lee received the valuable intelligence he had sought. He now knew that Grant had crossed the Pamunkey in force, although he was still unclear on the next steps that Grant might take and therefore waited for further developments. The two armies would fight in this general vicinity on May 30 in the Battle of Bethesda Church.
