= Matthew Butler =

American politician (1836-1909)

Matthew Calbraith Butler
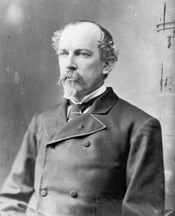

United States Senator from South Carolina
- In office March 4, 1877 – March 4, 1895
- Preceded by: Thomas J. Robertson
- Succeeded by: Benjamin Tillman

Member of the South Carolina House of Representatives from Edgefield County
- In office November 27, 1865 – December 21, 1866
- In office November 26, 1860 – December 21, 1861

Personal details
- Born: March 8, 1836 Greenville, South Carolina
- Died: April 14, 1909 (aged 73) Washington, D.C.
- Party: Democratic
- Spouses: Maria Calhoun Butler (Pickens) (m. 1858; died 1900) Nancy DeSaussure "Nannie" Bostick Butler (m. 1906)

Military service
- Allegiance: Confederate States of America; United States of America
- Branch/service: Confederate States Army; United States Army
- Years of service: 1861–1865 (CSA); 1898–1899 (USA)
- Rank: Major General (CSA); Major General (USA)
- Unit: Hampton's Legion
- Commands: 2nd South Carolina Cavalry; Butler's Cavalry Brigade; Butler's Cavalry Division
- Battles/wars: American Civil War; Spanish–American War

Matthew Calbraith Butler (March 8, 1836 – April 14, 1909) was a Confederate soldier, an American military commander, attorney and politician from South Carolina. He served as a major general in the Confederate States Army during the American Civil War, reconstruction era three-term United States Senator, and a major general in the United States Army during the Spanish–American War.

== Early life and career ==
Butler was born at Eagle's Crag near Greenville, South Carolina, to a large and prominent family of politicians and military men. His grandfather was U.S. Congressman William Butler. His mother, Jane Tweedy Perry of Rhode Island, was the sister of Commodore Oliver Hazard Perry and Matthew Calbraith Perry, for whom Matthew Calbraith Butler is named. His father, William Butler Jr., was a Congressman beginning in 1841.

His uncle Andrew Butler was a U.S. Senator from South Carolina and uncle Pierce Mason Butler was Governor of South Carolina. One of Matthew Butler's first cousins was Congressman Preston Brooks, who assaulted Senator Charles Sumner in 1856 on the floor of the U.S. Senate with a cane. He said it was because Sumner had insulted Senator Andrew Butler, at whose home Matthew lived as a young man. Two of Butler's first cousins twice removed were James Bonham (killed at the Battle of the Alamo) and Confederate General Milledge Luke Bonham.

In 1848 Butler went with his father to Arkansas but returned in 1851 to live with his uncle, who resided in Edgefield, South Carolina. He received his initial education in the city's Edgefield Academy, and then attended the South Carolina College, where he was a member of the Delta Kappa Epsilon fraternity, graduating in 1856. He studied law, was admitted to the state's bar association in 1857, and began practicing as a lawyer in Edgefield. He was elected to the South Carolina House of Representatives in 1860, but resigned in 1861 when the American Civil War began.

== Marriage and family ==
On February 25, 1858, Butler married Maria Calhoun Pickens. She was the daughter of Francis Wilkinson Pickens, who was elected as governor of the state.

== Civil War years ==
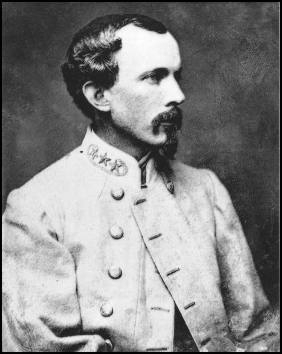
War-time photo of Butler

During the Civil War, Butler served in the cavalry in the Confederate Army of Northern Virginia, serving in Hampton's Legion, attaining the rank of captain on June 12, 1861, and then Major on July 21, 1861. When the legion's cavalry battalion was consolidated with the 4th South Carolina Battalion and became the 2nd South Carolina Cavalry Regiment on August 22, 1862, Butler was elected its colonel. Participating in many major actions with Hampton's Legion and the 2nd SC Cavalry, Butler lost his right foot to artillery shell at Battle of Brandy Station. He attained the rank of brigadier general in February 1864 and was referred to as "General Butler" in the postwar period.

Butler led a brigade in Wade Hampton's division of the Cavalry Corps. When Hampton took command of that corps, Butler became division commander. Late in the war, he transferred to the Carolinas together with Lt. Gen. Hampton, leading a division at the Battle of Bentonville. General Butler was wounded again in that action.

== Postwar ==
Financially ruined as a result of the war, Butler resumed his career as a lawyer in Edgefield. He was elected to the South Carolina House of Representatives beginning in 1866. He became a member of the Democratic Party and ran unsuccessfully for lieutenant governor in 1870 during the Reconstruction era. He was a member of the conservative Union Reform party, which aimed to exploit divisions within the Republican Party to provide a vehicle for Democrats to gain power among the majority African American electorate.

In July 1876, Butler defended two white farmers in court in their complaint of being denied free passage on Main Street of Hamburg, South Carolina, when the local chapter of the black militia, part of the National Guard, was parading on Independence Day. In court, Butler demanded that militia members turn over their arms to him, which they refused. Hundreds of white paramilitary members came to town and attacked the armory, where the militia company had taken refuge. They killed two freedmen on the street, including the town marshal, and later murdered five freedmen they had taken prisoner. One white man had been killed in early gunfire (see Hamburg massacre).

In 1877, after Federal troops had been withdrawn under a national Democratic compromise, Reconstruction ended. The Democratic Party regained control of the state in the 1876 elections. The South Carolina state legislature elected Butler to the United States Senate. During Senate hearings on his election, Butler was accused by Edgefield African-American leader Harrison N. Bouey of threatening to kill him and other local men. Butler served in the U.S. Senate for three terms, from 1877 to 1895, but lost for re-election in the South Carolina legislature to Benjamin Tillman, who was popular after serving as governor. In 1890 while serving in the Senate, Butler introduced a bill to provide federal aid to African Americans who would emigrate to Africa to promote segregation, sparking a national debate.

While in the Senate, Butler served on the Senate Foreign Relations, Territories, Military Affairs, Naval Affairs, Interstate Commerce, Civil Service and Retrenchment committees.

Butler practiced law in Washington, D.C., until 1898, when he was appointed major general of U.S. Volunteers during the Spanish–American War. He was one of a handful of former Confederate officers (along with Fitzhugh Lee, Thomas L. Rosser, and Joseph Wheeler) to serve in the U.S. Army during that war. After the American victory that year, he supervised the evacuation of Spanish troops from Cuba. He was honorably discharged from the U.S. Army on April 15, 1899. In 1899 General Butler joined the Pennsylvania Commandery of the Military Order of Foreign Wars.

In 1903, Butler was elected vice president of the Southern Historical Society. In 1904 he relocated to Mexico, where he served as president of a mining company. Having been a widower for years since his wife Maria died, in 1906 he married Nannie Whitman.

They returned to Washington, DC. Butler died there in 1909 while semi-retired. His body was returned to Edgefield, South Carolina, where he was buried in the city's Willow Brook Cemetery.

The Matthew C. Butler Camp #12 of the South Carolina Society of the Military Order of the Stars and Bars is named in his honor.

== See also ==
- List of American Civil War generals (Confederate)

== Notes ==
U.S. Senate
Preceded by Thomas J. Robertson	U.S. senator (Class 2) from South Carolina; 1877–1895; Served alongside: John J. Patterson, Wade Hampton, III, John L. M. Irby	Succeeded by Benjamin Tillman
