= Henry C. Lester =

American lawyer and military officer

Henry Clay Lester

Court Clerk for the 3rd Judicial District Court of Minnesota
- In office 1857–1861

County Clerk of Livingston County, New York

Personal details
- Born: November 1830 Fredonia, New York, U.S.
- Died: April 5, 1902 (aged 71) Geneseo, New York, U.S.
- Resting place: Temple Hill Cemetery

Military service
- Allegiance: United States of America
- Branch/service: Union Army
- Years of service: 1861-1862
- Rank: Colonel
- Unit: 1st Minnesota Infantry Regiment; 3rd Minnesota Infantry Regiment
- Commands: Company K, 1st Minnesota Infantry Regiment; 3rd Minnesota Infantry Regiment
- Battles/wars: American Civil War: First Battle of Bull Run; Battle of Ball's Bluff; First Battle of Murfreesboro (POW)

Henry Clay Lester (November 1830 — April 5, 1902) was an American lawyer, linguist, civil engineer, and American Civil War veteran. During the Civil War Lester served in the 1st Minnesota Infantry Regiment before being promoted to the rank of Colonel and commanding the 3rd Minnesota Infantry Regiment. Lester is infamously known in Minnesota history for his surrender to Nathan Bedford Forrest at the First Battle of Murfreesboro on July 13, 1862 which caused widespread dissent amongst the regiment.

== Early life ==
Henry Clay Lester was born in November 1830 in Fredonia, New York. Starting in 1846 Lester studied at Hamilton College where he studied law and was the president of the Phi Beta Kappa society, and was a member of the Psi Upsilon fraternity, he graduated from Hamilton College in 1850. Shortly after graduating Lester moved to Winona, Minnesota in Minnesota Territory in 1857 where he worked as a lawyer. While in Winona Lester served as the court clerk of the District Court of Minnesota for Minnesota's 3rd Judicial District.

== American Civil War ==
At the outbreak of the American Civil War Lester volunteered for service in the Union Army on April 30, 1861 and was mustered into Company K, nicknamed the "Winona Volunteers" of the 1st Minnesota Infantry Regiment. Lester was elected as the Captain of Company K and would serve with the 1st Minnesota during the regiment's first several engagements, notably the First Battle of Bull Run on July 21, 1861 and the Battle of Ball's Bluff on October 21, 1861. On November 15, 1861 Lester was promoted to the rank of Colonel and appointed to command of the newly mustered 3rd Minnesota Infantry Regiment. While serving in the 1st Minnesota William Lochren, Lester's First Lieutenant, described Lester as "efficient and very highly regarded".

According to the Minnesota Historical Society Lester was given a presentation sword made by Tiffany & Co. from the soldiers of the regiment on April 14, 1862 "in token of their high regard and confidence". From May 8 to July 11, 1862 Lester commanded the Twenty-Third brigade which had been sent to Pikeville, Tennessee in the Sequatchie Valley before being relieved by Colonel William Ward Duffield of the 9th Michigan Infantry Regiment.

=== Surrender at Murfreesboro ===
Only July 13, 1862 Nathan Bedford Forrest attacked and captured much of the Union garrison at Murfreesboro, Tennessee under the command of Thomas Turpin Crittenden who were garrisoned at Murfreesboro in order to guard and patrol the Nashville and Chattanooga Railroad. Elements of Crittenden's command who were captured included the 9th Michigan Infantry Regiment, the 7th Pennsylvania Cavalry Regiment, the 4th Kentucky Cavalry Regiment, the 3rd Minnesota Infantry Regiment along with Captain John M. Hewitt's Battery "B" Kentucky Light Artillery however were the only Union units which remained uncaptured. Forrest attempted to attack the 3rd Minnesota's camp which was guarded by teamsters, cooks, and sick or wounded men under the command of Corporal Charles H. Green. Corporal Green the defenders held their own against three separate charges before Green was finally wounded and his command surrendered. Green would later die of his wounds later that day. Green's display of stubbornness and resilience against Forrest's troops displays how the rest of the men of the 3rd Minnesota likely would have fought during the altercation, however, this was not so.

Forrest eventually sent an envoy, the Adjutant to the 9th Michigan Lieutenant Henry M. Duffield, who stated that Forrest's command outnumbered Lester and the 3rd Minnesota and that Forrest would only accept an unconditional surrender of Lester and his troops, however, this was a form of ruse de guerre or deception to get Lester to capitulate. Lester was convinced his force was surrounded, however, Lester's fellow officers and enlisted men were not convinced of Forrest's bluff. Lester spoke with Duffield before calling a meeting between his officers in order to put it to a vote. The majority of officers chose not to surrender instead voting to fight, however, Lester was not convinced. Lester held a second vote after some officers left when the majority who stayed voted to surrender. Among those who voted to fight were Chauncey Wright Griggs and Christopher Columbus Andrews who would both go on to become Colonels of the regiment. Around 4:00pm Lester surrendered the regiment along with, much to the dismay and disapproval of many of the NCO's and enlisted men of the 3rd Minnesota.

=== Dismissal from the military ===
Due to his surrender and the widespread disapproval of his men and officers Lester was dismissed from his command on December 1, 1862. Lester was replaced by the regiment's Major, Chauncey Griggs, who opposed Lester's decision to surrender at Murfreesboro. The regiment was eventually paroled and returned to Minnesota where it would take part in the Dakota War of 1862 at the Battle of Wood Lake.

== Later life ==
Following his military discharge Lester, disgraced, returned to his home state of New York. Lester worked as a lawyer and civil engineer in New York City from 1862 until 1880. Lester was eventually elected as the County Clerk of Livingston County, New York which he held for twelve years. Lester died on April 5, 1902 in Geneseo, New York from heart failure.
