= George Duffield (disambiguation) =

George Duffield (born 1946) is an English jockey.

George Duffield may also refer to:

- George C. Duffield, trail boss whose 1866 diary shaped the character Gil Favor (Eric Fleming) on the television series Rawhide
- George Duffield (minister, born 1732) (1732–1790), Presbyterian minister, aka George Duffield II
- George Duffield (minister, born 1794) (1794–1868), Presbyterian minister, aka George Duffield IV
- George Duffield Jr. (1812–1888), American hymn writer, aka George Duffield V
- George Duffield (film-maker), British film producer and wildlife photographer
