= George Duffield Jr. =

American Presbyterian minister and hymnodist (1818–1888)

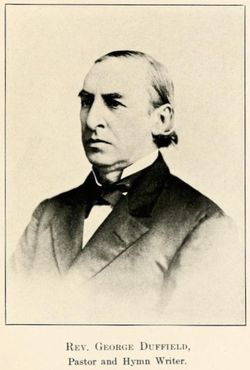
- Born: George Duffield V September 12, 1818 Carlisle, Cumberland County, Pennsylvania, US
- Died: July 6, 1888 (age 69) Bloomfield, Essex County, New Jersey, US
- Resting place: Elmwood Cemetery, Detroit, Wayne County, Michigan, US
- Occupation: Presbyterian Minister and Hymnodist.
- Education: Yale College (1837), Union Theological Seminary (1840)
- Notable works: "Stand up, Stand up for Jesus"
- Spouse: Anna Augusta Willoughby
- Children: 3, including Samuel Willoughby Duffield
- Parents: George Duffield IV, Isabella Graham Bethune Duffield

George Duffield Jr. D.D. (September 12, 1818 – July 6, 1888) was an American Presbyterian minister and hymnodist.

He was born on September 12, 1818, the fifth such George Duffield. He was born to George Duffield IV, who was also a Presbyterian minister, and Isabella Graham Bethune Duffield. His grandfather was George A. Duffield III. His great-grandfather, George Duffield II, was chaplain to the Continental Congress. His great-great-grandfather George D. Dunfield was a native of Belfast. His brother was Colonel William Duffield, commander of the 9th Michigan volunteer Infantry Regiment.

He graduated from Yale College in 1837, the youngest in his graduating class, and the Union Theological Seminary in New York. He was a pastor from 1840 to 1869 at numerous cities including Brooklyn, New York; Bloomfield, New Jersey; Philadelphia, Pennsylvania; Adrian, Michigan; Galesburg, Illinois; Saginaw City, Michigan; Ann Arbor, Michigan, and Lansing, Michigan. He married and had a son, minister Samuel Willoughby Duffield. He died on July 6, 1888, and was buried at Elmwood Cemetery in Detroit.

== Biography ==
George Duffield Jr. was born on September 12, 1818, in Carlisle, Pennsylvania. He grew up around his father and grandfather who were both preachers. At age thirteen, Duffield professed his complete devotion to the church. In 1834, at the age of sixteen, Duffield matriculated to Yale College. Despite his young age, he was known for his exceptional intellectual ability, particularly in the literary disciplines. He graduated from Yale in 1837, being the youngest out of the 104 members within the graduating class. Subsequently, he attended the Union Seminary in New York City where, in 1840, he received a doctorate in theology.

=== Family life ===
George Duffield Jr. was born to Rev. George Duffield IV and Isabella G. (Bethune) Duffield. His father was a prominent pastor and a leader in the New School wing of the Presbyterian Church.

Duffield was the eldest of five siblings, and his brother Colonel William W. Duffield, was the commander of the 9th Michigan Volunteer Infantry Regiment. One of his other siblings was Henry Duffield, who was a colonel in the Union Army during the American Civil War

His grandfather was George A. Duffield III. His great-grandfather, George Duffield II, was chaplain to the Continental Congress. His great-great-grandfather George D. Dunfield was a native of Belfast.

On October 22, 1840, Duffield married Anna Augusta Willoughby of Brooklyn, New York. They were married until October 30, 1880, when Anna died from a serious fever-like illness. Before her death, the couple became parents to two sons and a daughter. His eldest son was Rev. Samuel Willoughby Duffield, who was an American clergyman and author. It is unknown what the names of his other two children were, but it is of note that he was described as a loving father before his death in 1888. His daughter was also the last remaining family member of the Duffields after George's death as both of his sons died before him.

== Career ==
For the subsequent seven years following his graduation from Union Seminary in 1840, Duffield remained in New York where he extensively read, wrote, evangelized, and began to lay the foundations of his career in ministry. At the age of 28, he left his large church in New York to take charge of a rural church in Bloomfield, New Jersey. After six years in New Jersey, he accepted a new position in Philadelphia. His tenure in Philadelphia proved to be among the heights of his career as he was able to reach more people in need than ever before and had years of experience in ministry to guide him. While in Philadelphia, he was, alongside his work in the church, employed as an editor for the Christian Observer. During the height of the American Civil War, he moved to Michigan, his final permanent residence. His residence in Michigan was only interrupted once by a brief appointment to lead a congregation in Illinois. While in Michigan, he served on the board of regents for the University of Michigan, where he greatly influenced religious life on campus by establishing a Young Men's Christian Association.

=== Life in the Church ===
Due to his family's various ministry careers, George Duffield spent most of his life growing up and working in the church. Not only was he a minister himself, but he also composed several hymns, which are biblical songs of praise to Jesus. His career as a pastor impacted the global Church in all over the country, including New York, New Jersey, Pennsylvania, Michigan, and other such states.

He was ordained in 1840, and he spent his time in the church organizing revivals and teaching his congregation the love of Jesus. Duffield's pastoral journey in the 1800s led him to a very successful revival during the winter of 1857-58 that spread throughout the land of Philadelphia. The influence of this revival that Duffield participated in was commonly referred to during that time as "The Work of God in Philadelphia," and Pastor George Duffield happened to be at the helm of this quest for souls. During Duffield's 48 years as a preacher of the gospel, he also spent some time serving as a Christian Commission delegate at Gettysburg. Whether serving within his local church or evangelizing in other parts of the country, George Duffield spent the better part of his life dedicated to ministry.

== Legacy ==
Duffield was known as a zealous advocate of abolition and Union causes during the U.S. Civil War. Upon the tragic death of another abolitionist and friend, he shared in a sermon, "I caught its inspiration from the dying words of that noble young clergyman, Rev. Dudley Atkins Tyng, rector of the Epiphany Church, Philadelphia, who died about 1854. His last words were, ‘Tell them to stand up for Jesus: now let us sing a hymn.' As he had been much persecuted in those pro-slavery days for his persistent course in pleading the cause of the oppressed, it was thought that these words had a peculiar significance in his mind; as if he had said, ‘Stand up for Jesus in the person of the downtrodden slave.' (Luke 4:18)"

=== Influence on American culture ===
George Duffield Jr.'s contributions as a preacher and hymn writer have had a notable impact on American culture. In 1888, his work "Stand Up, Stand Up for Jesus" was described as "New School Presbyterianism's best known contribution to the American religious heritage". During the American Civil War, the hymn became popular amongst soldiers of the Union Army, likely due to its inspiring and militant language. It has continued to be sung by Christians of numerous denominations well after its composition in 1858. In addition, the hymn has been featured in episodes of The Waltons, amongst other TV shows and films.

In his service as a minister, Duffield Jr. influenced his congregation through sermons on what he considered to be "national sins". He preached against slavery, intemperance, the mistreatment of Native Americans and Mexicans, and the practice of polygamy amongst Mormons.

As a regent at the University of Michigan, he played a part in the establishment of the Young Men's Christian Association at the university, helping to obtain its location.

=== Role in the American Civil War ===
Duffield was substantially involved in the American Civil War. His brother was Colonel William W. Duffield, commander of the 9th Michigan Volunteer Infantry Regiment.

During the American Civil War, Duffield frequently ministered to Union soldiers, which he periodically documented. In a Sailor's magazine published during the war, he wrote in vivid detail his experience preaching to members of the Navy:

Agreeably to my appointment, at 10 o'clock a.m., I found myself on the deck of the double-turreted monitor Onondaga, Commodore Melauethou Smith of the Reformed Dutch Church. Half a mile back of us was now a battery of the enemy, eight guns already mounted, four more mounting, and ready at any moment to open fire upon us. Rather interesting and suggestive circumstances in which to preach! With the crew of the Onondaga and part of the crew of the Sangus, Captain Colbonen of the Alexander Church, Philadelphia, we had a full deck. I preached of Christ as at the hand of the kingdom of Providence as of the kingdom of Grace–as the Saviour of nations as well as individuals.

On April 21, 1861, following the Confederate attack on Fort Sumter, Duffield preached a sermon entitled "Courage in a Good Cause" which spoke out against the Confederacy and called for fearlessness in standing up for what is right.

In the Battle of Gettysburg, Duffield served as a Christian Commission Delegate for the Union Army.

=== Personal views on slavery ===
Consistent with his volunteer work within the Union during the American Civil War, Duffield was completely opposed to the applications of slavery. His sermons reflected this idea, which greatly upset many within his church and others. In fact, Duffield was so disgusted by the slavery sentiment possessed by many in his church that he ended up resigning from his Episcopal congregation.

However, Duffield was not swayed by those with opposing viewpoints and continued to preach to those who were willing to listen.

=== Personal views on religion ===
Duffield, in contrast to many religious leaders at the time, held a consociational ideology regarding the participation of various Protestant denominations and Catholicism within the body of Christianity. Duffield spoke out strongly against the pervasive infighting amongst Protestant denominations, as well as between Catholics and Protestants, calling instead for a unity of all Christians.

=== Temperance movement ===
In the movement of temperance, Duffield took a strong stance against the abuse of alcohol in America. He used his abilities as a speaker and writer to warn society of the poverty, wretchedness, and ruin caused by drinking. He preached this reform of temperance within the church and wrote about it as an editor of the Christian Observer or American Presbyterian. He served as a delegate in numerous local, state, and national conventions on the subject, and is said to have played a role in creating a National Temperance Society.

He served as an appointed secretary of the World's Temperance Convention, held at Metropolitan Hall in the city of New York on September 6, 1853.

In 1855, his historical sermon entitled His Locks Renewed was published. In the sermon, he details the history of alcohol usage in the US, steps that had been taken to resolve the problem, and how these steps would influence the present and future. On the topic of new alcohol restriction laws, he stated:

"TOTAL PROHIBITION ONE DAY IN THE WEEK!

TOTAL PROHIBITION EVERY DAY FOR MINORS AND DRUNKARDS!! THE UTTER EXTERMINATION OF TIPPLING HOUSES!!! This is wonderful progress indeed!

LET US MAINTAIN THE GROUND THAT WE HAVE GAINED."

In 1861, another historical sermon was published: The God of Our Fathers. In this, he expresses concern for the nation given the prevalence of intemperance within its political leaders.

== Hymns ==
Some of his hymns include:

- "Blessed Saviour, Thee I Love"
- "Parted for some Anxious Days"
- "Praise to our Heavenly Father, God"
- "Slowly in Sadness and in Tears"
- "Stand up, stand up for Jesus"

=== "Stand Up, Stand Up for Jesus" ===
Dudley Tyng was an Episcopalian minister and close friend of George Duffield Jr. Tyng was in a terrible accident in which he lost his arm, and eventually his life. His final statement was, "Let us all stand up for Jesus." His final words were the inspiration for George Duffield Jr.'s most famous hymn, "Stand up, stand up for Jesus". It is probable that this hymn is written in more hymn books across that country than any other hymn.

The hymn has not been without controversy due to its abrasively militant diction. One such controversy was in 1989 when the inclusion of the hymn in The United Methodist Hymnal was debated due to the militant diction of the hymn that many believed could be interpreted as a call to literal warfare, particularly when viewing it through the historical context of the Crusades that took place in the eleventh through thirteenth centuries. Additionally, the hymn has received omission from a 1989 collection as not to exclude handicapped people.
