= Freeman's Missouri Cavalry Regiment (partisan) =

- Active: January 1864 – May 1865
- Country: Confederate States of America
- Allegiance: Confederate States Army
- Branch: Cavalry
- Type: Partisan / Cavalry Regiment
- Size: 300–800 men (varied)
- Part of: Trans-Mississippi Department
- Nickname: Freeman's Brigade
- Engagements: American Civil War: Camden Expedition; Battle of Fitzhugh's Woods; Price's Missouri Expedition; Battle of Westport

Commanders
- Current commander: Colonel Thomas R. Freeman

The Freeman's Missouri Cavalry Regiment (also known as Freeman's Brigade) was a cavalry regiment that served in the Confederate States Army during the American Civil War. Formed primarily in early 1864 from pre-existing partisan and cavalry units, the regiment was highly active in the Trans-Mississippi theater.

== Formation and early operations ==
The regiment was officially organized on January 26, 1864, by Colonel Thomas R. Freeman. It was created by consolidating the 12th Missouri Cavalry Battalion with recruits and detached men from the 1st Missouri Cavalry, 2nd Arkansas Cavalry, and Slayback's Missouri Cavalry. Operating in northeast Arkansas and southern Missouri, the unit initially functioned as an independent command engaged in scouting, recruiting, and countering Federal incursions. On April 1, 1864, elements of the regiment took part in the Battle of Fitzhugh's Woods near Augusta, Arkansas, during the Union's Camden Expedition.

== Price's Missouri Expedition ==
In the autumn of 1864, the regiment was formally assigned to Marmaduke's Cavalry Division as part of Major General Sterling Price's massive expedition into Missouri. Placed within a newly designated brigade under Colonel Freeman's command, the regiment participated in heavy combat along the march. The unit was notably engaged at the Battle of Westport on October 23, 1864, where it served as part of the Confederate line defense near Byram's Ford. During the course of the campaign, the regiment suffered significant casualties, losing 13 killed, 20 wounded, and 148 missing, reducing its effective field strength by December 1864.

== Disbandment ==
Following the retreat of Price's army, the remnants of the regiment were ordered back to northeastern Arkansas to gather stragglers and preserve order. The regiment continued localized operations until it surrendered to Union authorities at Jacksonport, Arkansas, and was paroled in May 1865.

== See also ==
- List of Confederate units from Missouri in the American Civil War
