= O Deus ego amo te =

One of two Latin lyrics

O Deus ego amo te (Latin for "O God I love you") may refer to one of two Latin lyrics sometimes attributed to Francis Xavier, but of uncertain date and authorship.

== O Deus ego amo te, Nam prior tu amasti me ==
The one whose first stanza runs:

O Deus ego amo te,
Nam prior tu amasti me;
En libertate privo me
Ut sponte vinctus sequar te

has four additional stanzas in similar rhythm, the last three being apparently a paraphrase of part of a prayer in the "Contemplatio ad amorem spiritualem in nobis excitandum" of Ignatius Loyola's Spiritual: "Take, O Lord, my entire liberty … whatever I have or possess you have bestowed on me; back to thee I give it all, and to the rule of thy will deliver it absolutely. Give me only thy love and thy grace and I am rich enough; nor do I ask anything more."

The hymn (probably first printed in the "Symphonia Sirenum", Cologne, 1695) received in Zabuesnig's "Katholische Kirchengesänge" (Augsburg, 1822), the title of "The Desire of St. Ignatius". Edward Caswall's version appeared in his "Masque of Mary" etc. (1858), and in his "Hymns and Poems" (1873); also in various Catholic hymnbooks (e.g. "Roman Hymnal", New York, 1884; Toner's "Catholic Church Hymnal", New York, 1905; and in Ould's "The Book of Hymns", Edinburgh, 1910).

The hymn was translated by John Keble, John William Hewett, Erastus C. Benedict, Hamilton Montgomerie Macgill, Samuel Willoughby Duffield.

== O Deus ego amo te, Nec amo te ut salves me ==
The first stanza of the companion hymn is:

O Deus ego amo te,
Nec amo te ut salves me,
Aut quia non amantes te
Æterno punis igne.

There are four additional stanzas in irregular rhythm, while a variant form adds as a final line: "Et solum quia Deus es" (this given in Moorson's "A Historical Companion to Hymns Ancient and Modern", 2nd ed., Cambridge, 1903, p. 176). The hymn has been styled the "love-sigh" of Francis Xavier, who, it is fairly certain, composed the original Spanish sonnet "No me mueve, mi Dios, para quererte" –on which the various Latin versions are based, about the year 1546. There is not, however, sufficient reason for crediting to him any Latin version.

The form given above appeared in the "Cœleste Palmetum" (Cologne, 1696). An earlier Latin version by Joannes Nadasi in his "Pretiosæ occupationes morientium" (Rome, 1657), beginning: "Non me movet, Domine, ad amandum te". Nadasi again translated it in 1665. F. X. Drebitka ("Hymnus Francisci Faludi", Budapest, 1899) gives these versions, and one by Petrus Possinus in 1667. In 1668 J. Scheffler gave, in his "Heilige Seelenlust", a German translation–"Ich liebe Gott, und zwar unsonst" – of a version beginning "Amo Deum, sed libere".

The form of the hymn indicated above has been translated into English verse about twenty-five times, and is found in Catholic and non-Catholic hymn-books. Samuel Willoughby Duffield, a Presbyterian, speaks of both hymns in glowing terms, in his "Latin Hymn Writers and Their Hymns" (New York, 1889): "From the higher critical standpoint, then, these hymns are not unacceptable as Xavier's own work. They feel as if they belonged to his age and to his life. They are transfused and shot through by a personal sense of absorption into divine love, which has fused and crystallized them in its fiercest heat" (p. 300).

The Scriptural text for both hymns might well be II Cor., v, 14, 15, or perhaps better still I John, iv, 19 – "Let us therefore love God, because God hath first loved us". The text of both hymns is given in Daniel's "Thesaurus Hymnologicus", II, 335; of the second hymn, with notes, in March's "Latin Hymns", 190, 307 etc.
