= List of casualties during Price's Missouri Expedition =

This is a list of casualties during Price's Missouri Expedition during the American Civil War.

== Union ==
Casualties in the Cavalry Corps, Department of the Missouri
Command		Killed	Wounded	Missing	Aggregate
First Brigade	1st Cavalry Missouri State Militia	3 Men, 3 Total	2 Officers, 35 Men, 37 Total	None	40
First Brigade	4th Cavalry Missouri State Militia	1 Officer, 1 Men, 2 Total	5 Officers, 43 Men, 48 Total	None	50
First Brigade	7th Cavalry Missouri State Militia	3 Men, 3 Total	4 Officers, 17 Men, 21 Total	None	24
First Brigade	Total	1 Officer, 7 Men, 8 Total	11 Officer, 95 Men, 106 Total	None	114
Second Brigade	Cavalry Missouri State Militia	3 Men, 3 Total	2 Officers, 35 Men, 37 Total	None	40
Second Brigade	Merrill's Horse	None	5 Men, 5 Total	19 Men, 19 Total	24
Second Brigade	5th Cavalry Missouri State Militia	5 Men, 5 Total	6 Men, 6 Total	4 Men, 4 Total	15
Second Brigade	13th Missouri Cavalry	None	4 Officers, 4 Total	None	4
Second Brigade	7th Kansas Cavalry	None	1 Men, 1 Total	None	1
Second Brigade	17th Illinois Cavalry	None	2 Men, 2 Total	None	2
Second Brigade	Total	5 Men, 5 Total	4 Officers, 4 Men, 18 Total	23 Men, 23 Total	46
Third Brigade	6th Cavalry Missouri State Militia	1 Officer, 1 Man, 2 Total	1 Officer, 19 Men, 20 Total	None	22
Third Brigade	8th Cavalry Missouri State Militia	2 Men, 2 Total	2 Officers, 22 Men, 24 Total	None	26
Third Brigade	6th Provisional Enrolled Missouri Militia	5 Men, 5 Total	2 Officers, 26 Men, 28 Total	None	33
Third Brigade	2d Arkansas Cavalry	1 Man, 1 Total	11 Men, 11 Total	None	12
Third Brigade	Total	1 Officer, 9 Men, 10 Total	5 Officers, 78 Men, 83 Total	None	93
Fourth Brigade	4th Missouri Cavalry	4 Men, 4 Total	1 Officer, 11 Men, 12 Total	None	16
Fourth Brigade	10th Missouri Cavalry	None	1 Officer, 18 Men, 19 Total	1 Men, 1 Total	20
Fourth Brigade	3d Iowa Cavalry	3 Men, 3 Total	42 Men, 42 Total	None	45
Fourth Brigade	4th Iowa Cavalry	1 Officer, 1 Man, 2 Total	18 Men, 18 Total	2 Men, 2 Total	22
Fourth Brigade	7th Indiana Cavalry	Men, Total	6 Men, 6 Total	None	6
Fourth Brigade	Total	1 Officer, 8 Men, 9 Total	2 Officers, 95 Men, 97 Total	3 Men, 3 Total	109
Grand Total		3 Officers, 29 Men, 32 Total	22 Officers, 282 Men, 304 Total	26 Men, 26 Total	362

== Confederate ==
Return of casualties in Shelby's brigade during the Missouri Expedition, August 29 to December 2, 1864
Command	Killed	Wounded	Missing	Aggregate
Elliot's regiment	7 Men	3 Officers, 15 Men	None	25
Gordon's regiment	15 Men	5 Officers, 45 Men	2 Officers, 39 Men	106
Shank's regiment	3 Men	3 Officers, 19 Men	10 Men	35
Smith's regiment	10 Men	5 Officers, 35 Men	1 Officer, 19 Men	70
Collin's battery	1 Officer	None	2 Men	3
Total	1 Officer, 36 Men	16 Officer, 114 Men	3 Officers, 70 Men	239

List of killed and wounded in Marmaduke's brigade
Command	Killed	Wounded
Greene's regiment	3 Officers, 16 Men	9 Officers, 101 Men
Burbridge's regiment	1 Officer, 12 Men	10 Officers, 41 Men
Kitchen's regiment	1 Officer, 9 Men	2 Officers, 25 Men
Jeffer's regiment	2 Officers, 20 Men	7 Officers, 28 Men
Lawther's regiment	1 Officer, 17 Men	6 Officers, 42 Men
Stallard's escort	None	1 Officer, 7 Men
Total	8 Officers, 74 Men	35 Officers, 244 Men

Special report of killed, wounded, and missing of the Seventh Regiment of Missouri Cavalry while on the expedition in Missouri
Command	Killed	Wounded	Captured and Missing	Deserted
New California	None	None	6 Men	None
Boonville	None	1 Man	None	None
Glasgow	None	2 Men	None	None
Franklin County	None	None	1 Officers, 1 Men	None
Blue Mills (Little Blue)	2 Men	1 Officers, 12 Men	None	None
Independence	None	3 Men	4 Men	None
Big Blue	5 Men	8 Men	None	None
Stampede on the prairie	1 Officer, 5 Men	1 Officer, 11 Men	4 Officers, 53 Men	13 Officers, 252 Men
Total	1 Officers, 12 Men	2 Officers, 37 Men	5 Officers, 64 Men	13 Officers, 252 Men

Casualties in Freeman's brigade in the several battles in Missouri since September 20, 1864
Command	Killed	Wounded	Captured	Missing	Total	Original strength	Strength present September 20	Present strength
Freeman's regiment, organized January 26, 1864	13	20	36	112	181	800	550	250
Fristoe's regiment, organized July 5, 1864	11	40	20	45	116	830	530	175
Ford's regiment, organized August 27, 1864	3	5	5	6	19	442	276	150

Casualties in Tyler's brigade (unarmed)
Command	Killed	Wounded
Perkin's regiment	5	13
Searcy's regiment	3	4
Coffee's regiment	3	7
Total	11	24
