= George Duffield (minister, born 1732) =

Minister

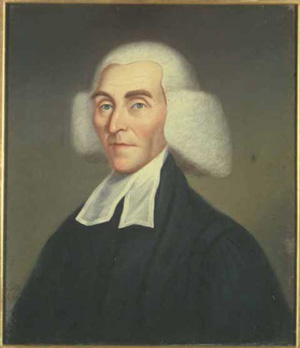
- portrait by Charles Peale Polk
- Born: 7 October 1732; Lancaster County, Province of Pennsylvania
- Died: 2 February 1790 (aged 57); Philadelphia, Pennsylvania
- Occupation: Pastor
- Notable work: "Thanksgiving Sermon on Peace" (December 11, 1783)
- Spouse: Margaret Armstrong
- Theological work
- Era: Colonial Period
- Language: English
- Tradition or movement: Presbyterian

George Duffield (October 7, 1732 – February 2, 1790) was a leading eighteenth-century Presbyterian minister. He was born in Lancaster County, Province of Pennsylvania in 1732. In 1779, Duffield was elected a member of the American Philosophical Society. Because of his involvement in the American Revolution and close association to General George Washington he is often referred to as "The revolutionary patriot" or "The revolutionary chaplain". Before and during the American Revolutionary War, by means of his inciteful and inspirational sermons, he preached the virtue of armed resistance, prompting the British Crown to place a reward on his head.Duffield served under General Washington at the Battles of Princeton and Trenton.

== Early life and family ==
Duffield family line was of Huguenot origin. After graduating from Nassau Hall in 1752, he served as a minister for fifteen years, enduring the hardships of frontier preaching, before his arrival to Philadelphia. Duffield married his first wife, Elizabeth Blair, on March 8, 1756; who suddenly died the next year. On March 5, 1759. he remarried to Margaret Armstrong, a daughter of Archibald Armstrong of Delaware and sister-in-law of General John Armstrong who was an elder in Duffield's church. Margaret Armstrong is often incorrectly cited as being a sister of John Armstrong. His grandson, George Duffield, Jr. was born on July 4, 1794 and was a leading 19th-century New School Presbyterian minister, and his great-grandson was George Duffield V, the American Presbyterian minister and hymnodist, who was a pastor from 1840 to 1869 at numerous cities in Pennsylvania, New Jersey, New York, and Michigan; known for authoring Stand Up, Stand Up for Jesus.

== Education and preparation for the ministry ==
George Duffield was first educated at Newark Academy in Delaware. He trained at the College of New Jersey (now Princeton), and graduated in 1752. He did personal study and ministerial preparation in theology with the guidance of Dr. Robert Smith, of Pequea, Pennsylvania. His ordination to Presbyterian ministry led him to serve three churches in central Pennsylvania in Carlisle, Newville, and Dillsburg.

== Carlisle, Pennsylvania ==
Duffield served as tutor at the College of New Jersey from 1754 to 1756. Thereafter which he received his license to preach on, March 11, 1757 by the Presbytery of New Castle.

Duffield moved to Carlisle, Pennsylvania in 1757, and ministered to multiple churches until 1772 when he accepted the Pastorate of the Old Pine Street church.. He was known to be an ardent and animated preacher. In the summer and fall of 1766, Duffield and the Reverend Charles Clinton Beatty embarked on a missionary tour that took them through the western valleys of Pennsylvania, Maryland, and Virginia, establishing churches, ministering to the settlers along with the various Indian nations they encountered.

== Old Pine Street Presbyterian Church ==
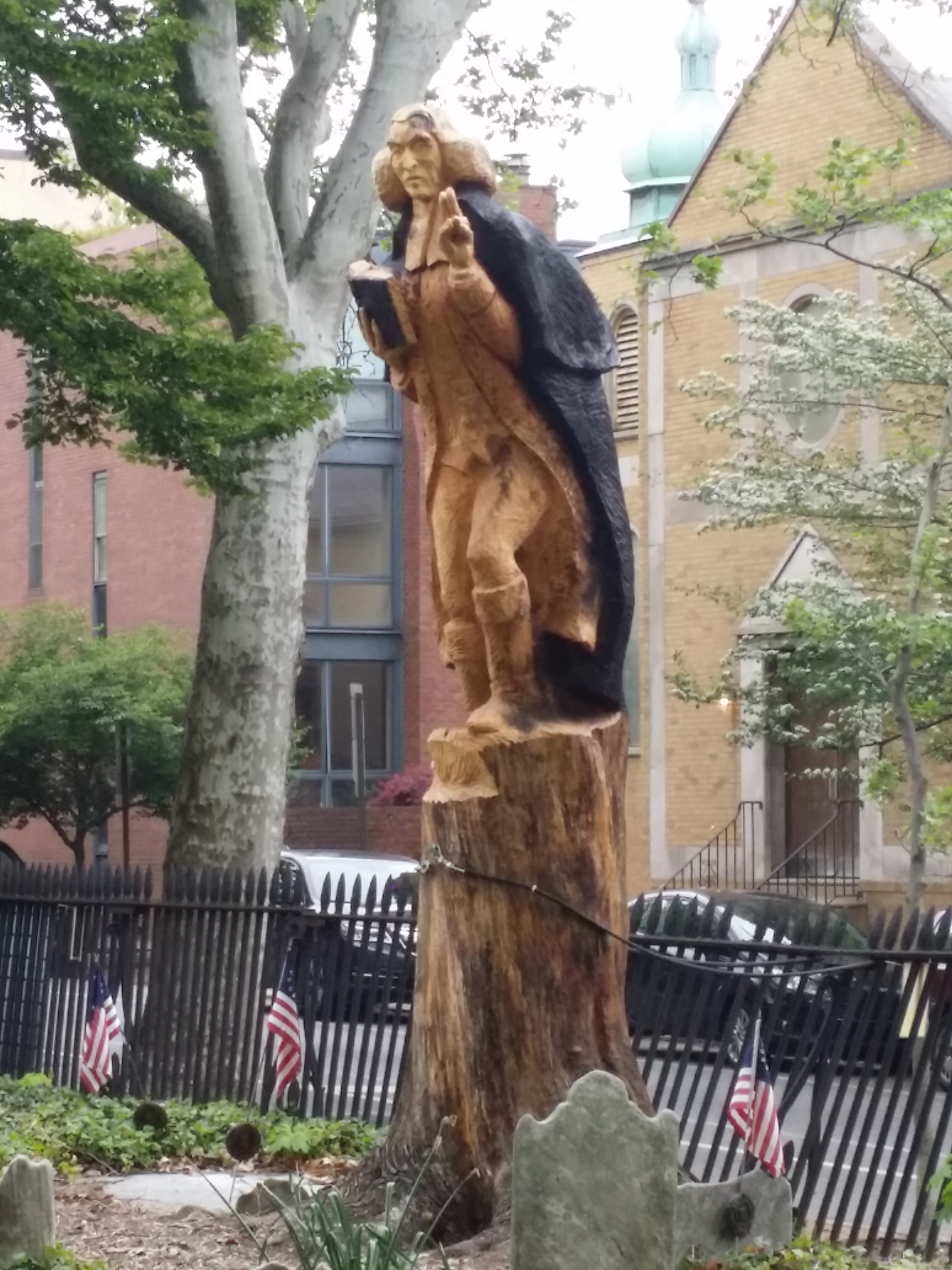
George Duffield sculpture by Roger Wing (2015) in May 2016

Old Pine Street was built in 1768 at the behest of the First Church, prompted by the growing congregation of another Presbyterian church, with the intention that the two churches would be under the authority of a common committee. The call of the Reverend George Duffield in 1771, however, was in direct opposition to the wishes of the First Church, and his forcible settlement as pastor in the succeeding year, caused an early and nearly irreconcilable rift between the two churches. The proposed church almost did not take because Old Side (Old Light) members objected to Duffield's adherence to New Side (New Light) revivalist ideas.From the fall of 1772 until his death in 1790, he served as pastor at the Old Pine Street Presbyterian Church in Philadelphia. During the American Revolutionary War, he served as a chaplain of the Continental Congress.

== American Revolution ==
Duffield was an inspirational and driving force behind the cause of American independence. During a sermon he delivered before several companies of the Pennsylvania militia and members of Congress in 1776, just four months before the Declaration of Independence was signed, he asserted his optimism, necessity and support for American independence. Duffield was present at the battles of Princeton and Trenton. Four days after the Declaration of Independence was signed Duffield received a commission as Chaplain of the Pennsylvania Militia, serving under general Washington.

The British understandably considered that one pastor's presence among the militia was much more dangerous than an entire company. In one case, a pastor, John Rossburgh, was captured and while he was kneeling in prayer for his life was put to death by bayonet. Duffield came upon his hurriedly dug gravesite by the roadside and had it removed to a nearby graveyard and gave Rossburgh a decent buried..Duffield was much more visible than most pastors in that he had publicly declared that "Heaven had designed this Western world as the asylum for liberty". Accordingly, the British were offering a reward of fifty pounds for his capture, where Duffield naturally assumed that he would meet the same fate if captured.

== Final years and legacy ==
Duffield was trustee of the College of New Jersey (today known as Princeton University) from 1777 to 1790. After the Revolution he was active in the organization of the Presbyterian Church and served as the first clerk of the General Assembly. George Duffield died in Philadelphia at the age of fifty-eight. Duffield was greatly admired by members of the Continental Congress who attended his services and placed great value in his inspirational influence in promoting the cause of independence. Among them was John Adams who entered in his diary of "the genius and eloquence of Duffield". Ashbel Green delivered the sermon at Duffield's the funeral.

== See also ==
- Israel Evans (chaplain) — Presbyterian chaplain who served during the Revolutionary War
- Robert Blackwell (1748–1831), minister who served at Valley Forge
- John Hurt (chaplain), minister who served at Valley Forge
- List of clergy in the American Revolution

== Bibliography ==
- Clyde, John C. (1880). Rosbrugh, a Tale of the Revolution. Easton.
- Duffield, George (1867). Record of the golden wedding of Rev. George Duffield, D.D. and Isabella Graham Bethune Duffield. Philadelphia: Printed by H. B. Ashmead.
- Gibbons, Herbert Allen (June 1905). "Old Pine Street Church, Philadelphia, in the Revolutionary War". Journal of the Presbyterian Historical Society (1901-1930). 3 (2). Presbyterian Historical Society: 71–78. JSTOR 23322676.
- Gibbons, Hughes Oliphant (1905). A history of old Pine Street : being the record of an hundred and forty years in the life of a colonial church. Philadelphia: John C. Winston Company.
- Kramer, Leonard J. (March 1954). "Muskets in the Pulpit". Journal of the Presbyterian Historical Society. 32 (1): 37–51. JSTOR 23325210.
- Mackie, Alexander (March 1955). "George Duffield, Revolutionary Patriot". Journal of the Presbyterian Historical Society (1943-1961): 3–22. JSTOR 23325396.
- Miller, Samuel (1813). Memoirs of the Rev. John Rodgers, D. D., late pastor of the Wall-street and Brick churches in the city of New-York. New York: Whiting and Watson, theological and classical booksellers. J. Seymour, printer. pp. 480–496.
- "Duffield, George". Dartmouth Libraries. 2026.
- "February 2: George Duffield [1732-1790 ]". This Day in Presbyterian History. 2 February 2018.
- Sandoz, Ellis (1991). Political sermons of the American founding era, 1730-1805. Indianapolis: LibertyPress. ISBN 9780865971776.
- Starr, Harris E. (1932). George Duffield. Vol. V. Dictionary of American Biography; New York: Charles Scribner's Sons.
- "American Philosophical Society Member History". search.amphilsoc.org.
- Tritt, Richard. "Who Were the Duffields?". First Presbyterian Church of Carlise.
- White, William Prescott (1895). The Presbyterian church in Philadelphia : a camera and pen sketch of each Presbyterian church and institution in the city. Philadelphia, Pa.: Allen, Lane & Scott.
