= Henry M. Duffield =

Union Army officer

Henry Martyn Duffield
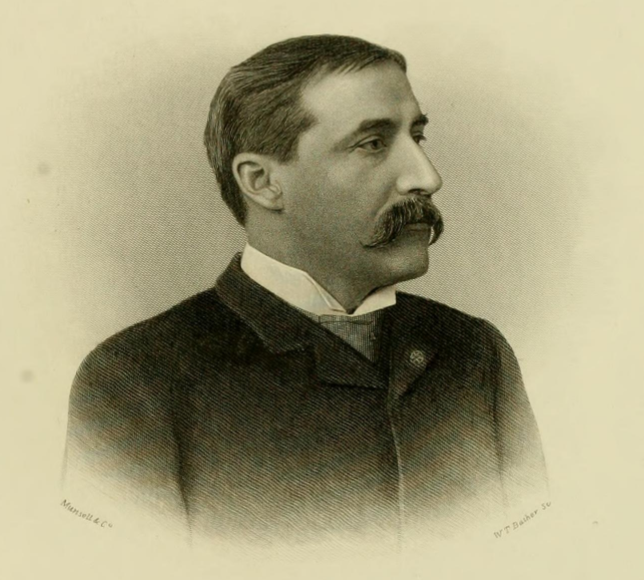
- Born: May 15, 1842; Detroit, Michigan
- Died: July 13, 1912 (aged 70); Detroit, Michigan
- Burial place: Elmwood Cemetery, Detroit, Michigan
- Relatives: William Ward Duffield; Rev. George Duffield
- Military career
- Allegiance: United States of America; Union
- Branch: United States Army; Union Army
- Service years: 1861–1864 and 1898
- Rank: Brigadier General
- Units: 9th Michigan Volunteer Infantry Regiment; Army of the Cumberland
- Commands: Separate Brigade, Third Division, Second Army Corps
- Conflicts: American Civil War: First Battle of Murfreesboro; Battle of Stones River; Battle of Chickamauga; Atlanta campaign; Battle of Resaca; Battle of Missionary Ridge; Battle of Peachtree Creek; Battle of Jonesborough; Spanish–American War: Battle of the Aguadores

Henry Martyn Duffield (May 15, 1842 – July 13, 1912) was a colonel in the Union Army during the American Civil War, lawyer, candidate for U.S. Representative from Michigan's 1st district in 1876; brigadier general of U.S. Volunteers during the Spanish–American War, presidential elector for Michigan in 1904, and a member of the Grand Army of the Republic.

== Early life and family ==
Duffield was born in Detroit, Michigan. He was the son of Rev. George Duffield and Isabella Graham (Bethune) Duffield. His father was the pastor of the First Presbyterian Church of Detroit.

Duffield was educated in the public schools of Detroit, graduating from the Old Capitol School in 1856. He spent one year in the University of Michigan before he transferred and graduated from Williams College in Massachusetts in 1861. In 1863 he married Frances Pitt. He was the brother of General William Ward Duffield. His paternal great grandfather, Rev. George Duffield, was, on July 6, 1776, appointed by Governor Morton, Chaplain to the Pennsylvania forces in the Revolutionary Army. On the Sunday following he dismissed his congregation with these words: "I hope the women will worship here in silence on the next Sabbath, and the men will be with me in Washington's Army." He was called "the fighting parson," and a price of fifty pounds sterling was put upon his head. He was subsequently associated with Bishop White as joint chaplain of the Continental Congress.

== American Civil War ==
Duffield enlisted in August 1861 as a private in the Ninth Regiment, Michigan Volunteers. He was made First Lieutenant and Adjutant of the regiment on October 12 of the same year. He participated in the engagement with the Rebel forces under General N. B. Forrest at Murfreesboro, Tennessee, in July 1862. In this engagement his brother, General W. W. Duffield, then Colonel of the regiment, was twice wounded. The fighting was so severe that the wounded could not be removed from the field, and after the engagement Adj. Duffield, together with his wounded brother, was captured, but was exchanged two months later.

In the spring of 1862, Duffield was detailed Assistant Adjutant General of the Twenty-third Brigade, Army of the Cumberland. In the campaign from Nashville to Chattanooga, 1863, he was attached to the headquarters of General George H. Thomas, and given command of the mounted Provost Guard of the Eleventh Army Corps, the members of which he was allowed to select, and took an active part in all the important battles of that campaign, including Stone River and Chickamauga, where he was wounded. During the Siege of Chattanooga, October 23, 1863, by the Confederate forces under General Braxton Bragg, he was promoted Post Adjutant.

In this office, by order of Major General Thomas, he issued the orders for the establishment of Chattanooga United States cemetery, giving particular attention and direction to its purpose, and to the plan for carrying out that purpose. The plan was subsequently adopted by General Thomas, and from it grew the system of National cemeteries. When Major General Thomas was assigned to the command of the Department of the Cumberland, Colonel Duffield was appointed on his staff as Assistant Provost Marshal General of the department, in which capacity he served for the remainder of the war.

During the campaign of Thomas from Chattanooga to Atlanta, Duffield was acting Provost Marshal General of the Army of the Cumberland, participating in all the hard fought battles of this Union commander, among them being Resaca, Missionary Ridge, Peach Tree Creek and Jonesboro. This campaign terminated at Atlanta, where, on October 14, 1864, Duffield was mustered out by reason of expiration of service.

== Post American Civil War career ==
On returning from the army, Duffield began the study of law, and in April 1865, he was admitted to the bar. He formed a partnership with his brother, D. Bethune Duffield, which continued until 1876. He was attorney for the Board of Education of Detroit from 1867 to 1871. While in this position he carried to a successful termination suits brought to recover from the County Treasurer, moneys received from fines in the municipal courts. Under provision of the Michigan State Constitution, these funds were required to be applied to the support of a public library, but had been diverted to the payment of expenses of the courts and to other uses. Their recovery to the Board laid the foundation for the present public library system of Detroit.

Starting in 1881, Duffield served two terms as city attorney, represented the city of Detroit in all its litigation during that period. Both in his official capacity and in private practice, he had many important cases, including, in the latter, the famous Reeder farm escheat cases, and the Stroh-WinsorHudson crooked paper case, in which he defeated the holders of the paper. He argued the case against the validity of the Miner Electoral Law, both in the Michigan and United States Supreme Courts, and was also engaged in the Detroit Street Railway cases in the higher United States Courts. With the exception of the time spent in service during the Spanish–American War, Duffield continued in his practice.

Duffield was a supporter of the Republican Party and often involved in politics. He was present at many city and county conventions of the party, and for a period of about fifteen years attended every Michigan Republican convention. He was Permanent Chairman of the spring Michigan Convention in 1877 and of the fall Convention at Jackson, Michigan in 1880. In 1888 he was Chairman of the State Central Committee of the Republican Party and was delegate both to the State and National Conventions. He was also Chairman of Michigan's delegation in the Minneapolis Republican Convention in 1892, when he cast the vote of nineteen of the delegates for William McKinley.

He ran for Congress in 1892, running in the Michigan First District, which at the time was a Detroit based district. He lost to incumbent Democrat J. Logan Chipman.

== War with Spain ==
Duffield was on the staffs successively of Governors Bagley, Croswell, Jerome and Alger, and kept up a lively interest in the Detroit Light Guard with which he had long been connected. When the call came for volunteers in the Spanish-American War, although the general officers were taken mostly from the Regular Army, it was determined to select some from among the men who had already seen service in the volunteer army, account being taken of their age, condition of health and record in the Civil War.

It was in carrying out this purpose that a commission as brigadier general was offered to Duffield and accepted, dating from May 27, 1898. On June 14, he assumed command of a separate Brigade of the Second Army Corps, composed of the Thirty-third and Thirty-fourth Michigan and Ninth Massachusetts Volunteers. It was the desire of the Government to reinforce General Shafter's army which had just landed in Cuba, but only one vessel, the transport Yale, was then available, and that could carry only one brigade. There were two brigades in Camp Alger, and it was determined to take the one which should first report in readiness to move. Duffield's brigade was then on a practice march to the Potomac, but it returned to camp, won in the test and was dispatched to Santiago.

In the Battle of July 1, Duffield was assigned to the duty of making a demonstration on the extreme left, at Aguadores, without any means of crossing the stream, and thus coming into the general engagement. The task was performed in a manner of which Shaffer afterwards said, in an interview in Detroit: "As for General Duffield, of your City, he is a soldier, every inch of him. He had a thankless job at the Battle of Aguadores, but he acquitted himself nobly."

A few days afterwards at Siboney, Major General Young was taken ill, and the command of his division was turned over to Duffield, who was in turn attacked with yellow fever, went into hospital, and later in the month was sent north as a convalescent. He joined his family and spent several weeks with them on the coast of Maine, regaining his health. His last act in connection with the war was as one of the speakers at the Peace Jubilee in Chicago, October 18, 1898.

== Organizations ==
Duffield had associations with a number of political, military and social organizations. He was a member of The Union League Club of New York; the University Club of New York; the Army and Navy Club of Washington; the Society of the Army of the Cumberland; the Society of the Army of Santiago de Cuba; the Society of the Spanish–American War; the Military Order of the Loyal Legion of the United States; Detroit Post, Grand Army of the Republic; Sons of the American Revolution; the Yondotega, Detroit and Country Clubs of Detroit; the Chi Psi College Fraternity, and of the Michigan Club; of the latter, serving as both president and, later, a director.
