= Old Pine Street Church =

Coordinates: 39.94345°N 75.14944°W

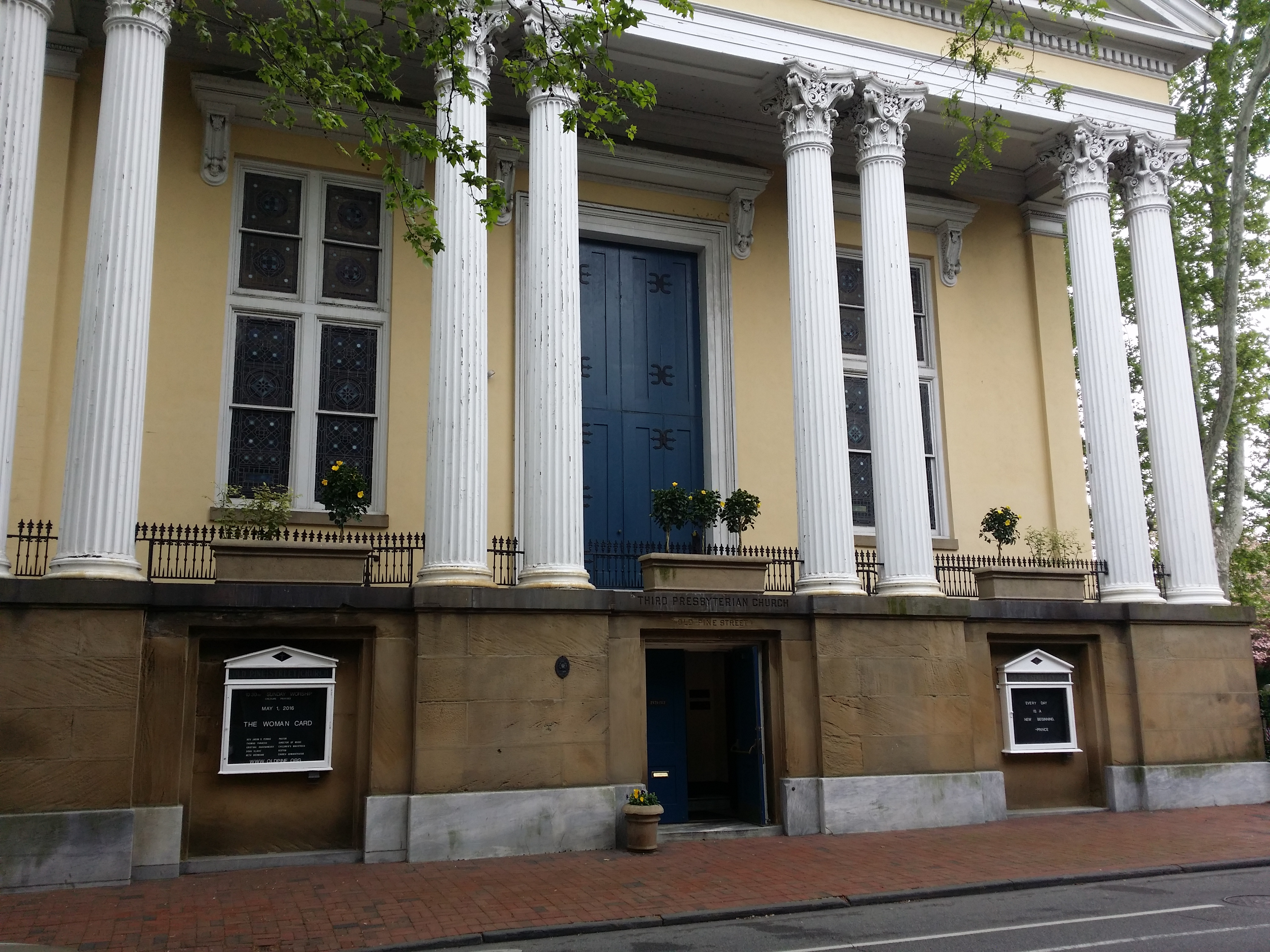
- Old Pine Street Church
- Location: Philadelphia
- Denomination: Presbyterian Church (USA)
- Website: www.oldpine.org

Architecture
- Functional status: Active

Old Pine Street Church is a Presbyterian Church in Philadelphia, Pennsylvania founded by the Reverend George Duffield in 1768. The church has a colorful history involving the American Revolution and the American Civil War. Old Pine Street Church still stands at Fourth and Pine Streets.

== Eighteenth century ==
Old Pine Street Church, a Presbyterian Church, was built in 1768, founded by the Reverend George Duffield. The construction of the church building was commenced in 1766, and completed in about two years at a cost of about $ 16,000. A dispute over the Old Pine property began shortly after the church was founded in 1768 by the Reverend George Duffield and his followers. Upon the "forced" admission of George Duffield a suit of ejectment was instituted by the incorporated committee, which was not the advice Synod, after their meeting in 1772,strongly recommended that the two congregations in dispute settle their differences about property by arbitration.

The church’s founding leaders were sued by factions within the broader Presbyterian governing body (the Synod of New York and Philadelphia) over the legality of the new church's establishment and land ownership.

=== American Revolution ===
Old Pine became known as the "Church of the Patriots" because many of the parishioners such as John Adams, stood with George Washington. George Duffield served as pastor from 1772 until 1790; during the American Revolution, Duffield served as a chaplain of the Continental Congress.

The descendants of Francis Bailey, have a history for being honored members of Old Pine Street. Bailey, was printer to Congress. When the British occupied Philadelphia, he retired to Lancaster, and there published an almanac for 1779, in which Washington for the first time was called "The Father of His Country.".

During the sessions of the Continental Congress,the future President, John Adams, attended services at Old Pine Street Church.

== 19th century ==
Ezra Stiles Ely followed by Thomas Brainerd were the pastors during the mid 19th century.

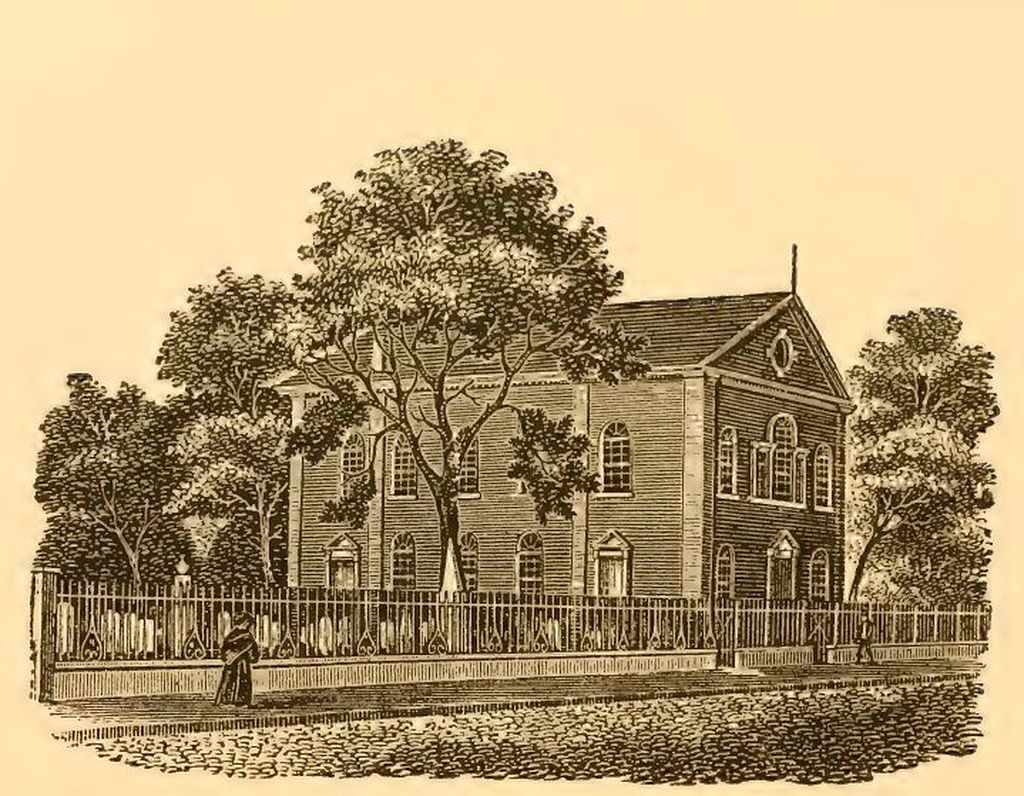
Old Pine Street Church, before renovations were made in1837

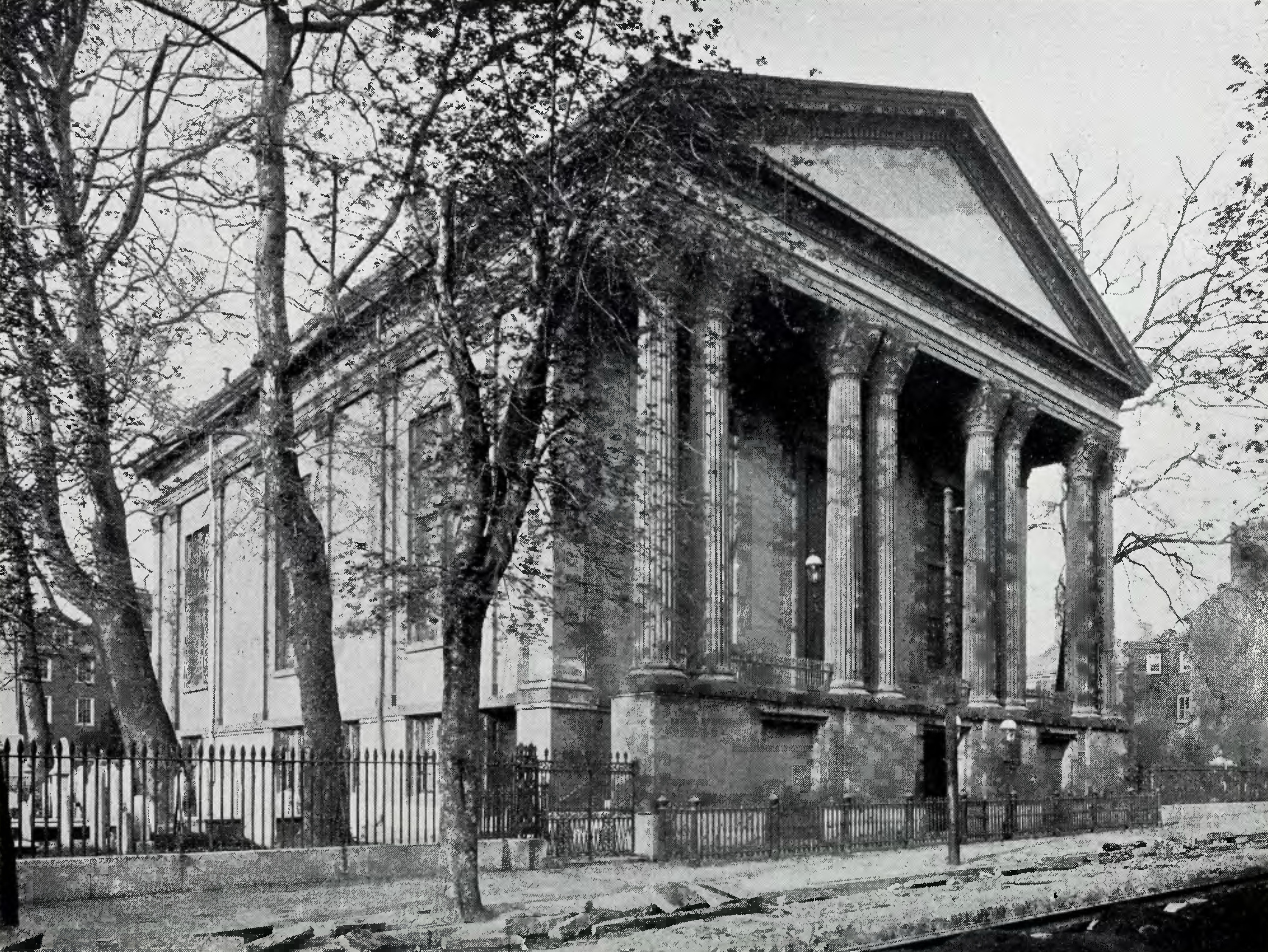
Old Pine Street Church (Third Presbyterian Church)

Joseph Bonaparte was married here in 1820.

== Cemetery ==
The churchyard dates to the congregation's place in the American Revolution. The church counts those buried to include

- A signer of the Constitution of the United States
- 3 Continental Congress attendees
- 2 colonial printers
- Over 200 Revolutionary War soldiers
- 1 Tory
- Ringer of the Liberty Bell
- 9 members of the Carpenter's Company of Philadelphia

The cemetery also includes medical doctors, lawyers, sea captains, silversmiths, stonemasons, tavern keepers, tradesmen, and everyday citizens from the Colonial era. The last interment in the churchyard was in 1958 for In Ho Oh, a murdered University of Pennsylvania student.

=== Notable burials ===
- Jared Ingersoll (1749—1822), lawyer and statesman
- Jonathan Dickinson Sergeant (1746-1793), politician - reinterred to Laurel Hill Cemetery in 1878
- Joel Barlow Sutherland (1792—1861), U.S. Congressman
- Eugene Ormandy (1899-1985), conductor

== Current activity ==
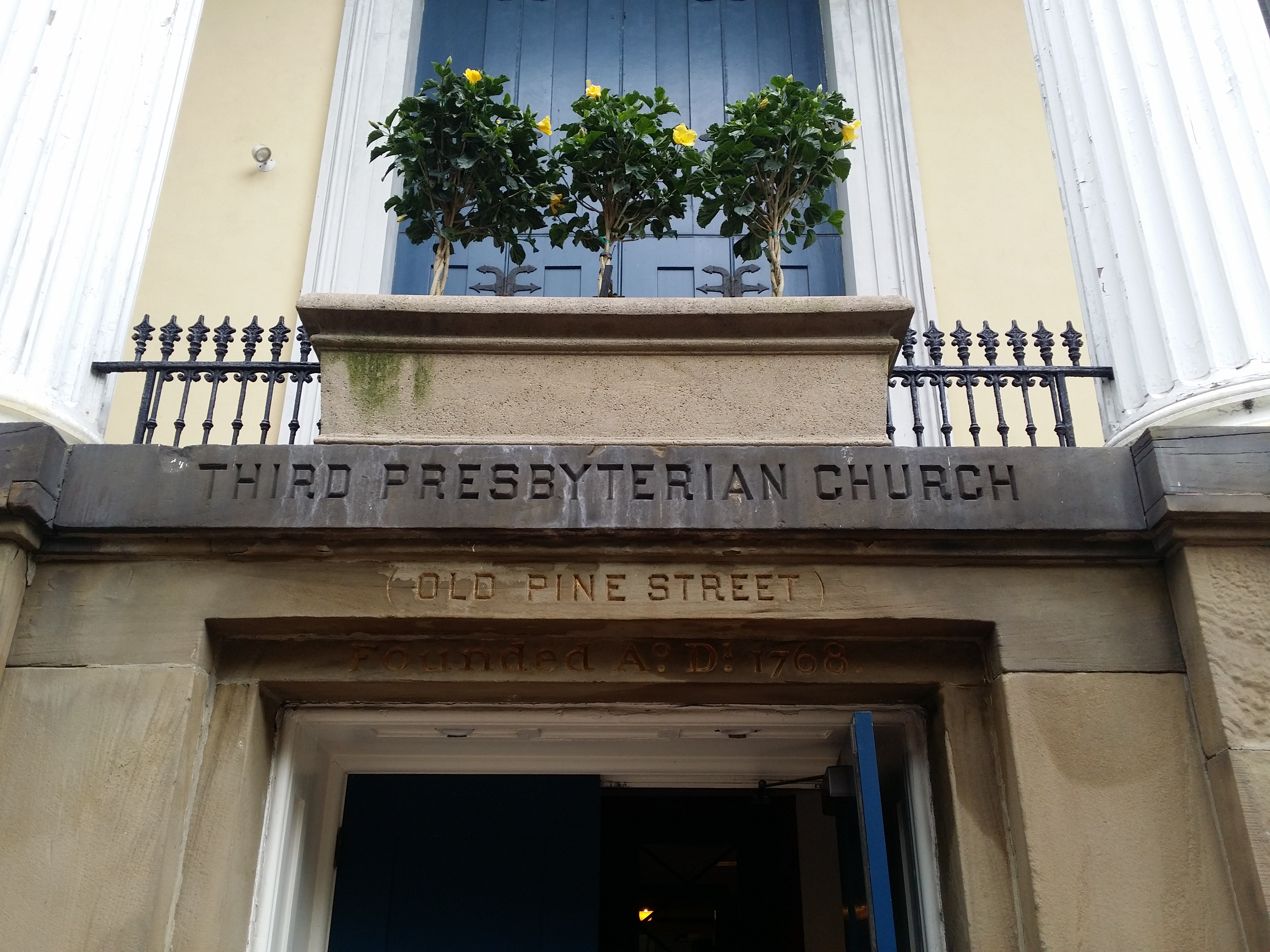
Old Pine Street Church, May 2, 2016

Old Pine is now the only remaining Presbyterian building in Philadelphia from before the American Revolutionary War.

Continuing its more than 200 years of community activism, Old Piners were among the first to respond to the problem of the homeless. In 1982, it founded and, in the beginning, sheltered the Philadelphia Committee for the Homeless. In 1978, Old Pine started its Saturday for Seniors (SFS) program to provide a weekend hot lunch and take-home snack for the city's elderly—a Philadelphia first. With no charge and no means test, SFS has become a vital weekend home for more than 100 older people from all over the city. Old Pine continues its commitment to serve the poor in the 21st century. The congregation participates in a local Habitat for Humanity project in the Point Breeze neighborhood of Philadelphia, joining with other Presbyterian congregations to jump-start development there and in surrounding blocks. In addition, it sends members to communities impacted by natural disasters: the Gulf Coast to help the clean-up and rebuilding effort in the wake of Hurricane Katrina; flooding disasters in Huntington, West Virginia and Towanda, Pennsylvania; Bayville, New Jersey after Hurricane Sandy.

== Sources ==
- Gibbons, Hughes Oliphant (1905). A history of old Pine Street : being the record of an hundred and forty years in the life of a colonial church. Philadelphia: John C. Winston Company.
- Strong, James; McClintock, John (1981). "Brainerd, Thomas, Dd". The Cyclopedia of Biblical, Theological, and Ecclesiastical Literature. Grand Rapids, Michigan: Baker Book House.
- White, William Prescott (1895). The Presbyterian church in Philadelphia : a camera and pen sketch of each Presbyterian church and institution in the city. Philadelphia, Pa.: Allen, Lane & Scott.
- —— (June 1914). "Presbyterian Churches of Philadelphia". Journal of the Presbyterian Historical Society (1901-1930). 7 (6): 257–273. JSTOR 23323373.
