= Grace Duffield Goodwin =

American author and anti-suffragist (1869–1926)

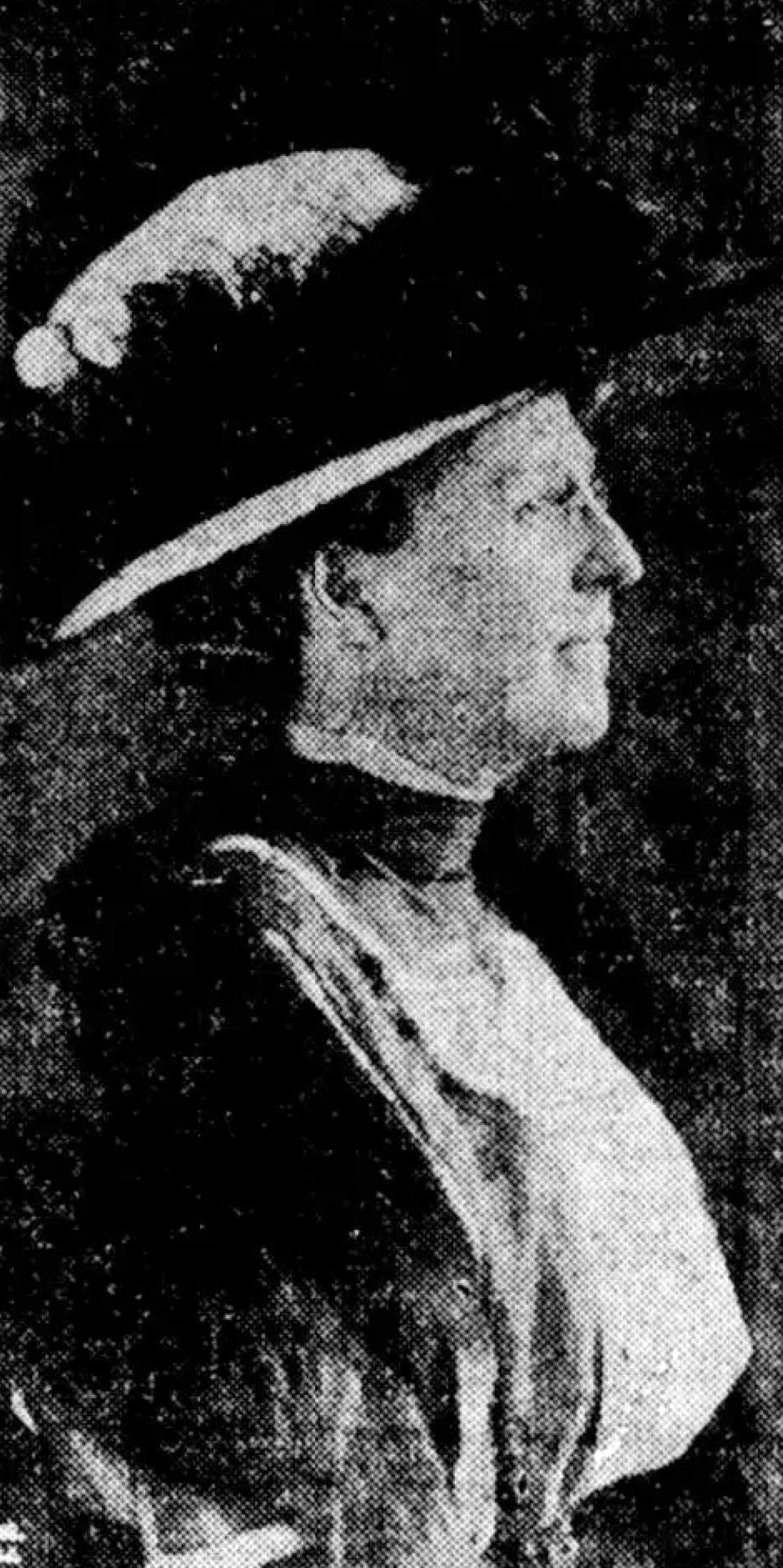
- Born: Grace Hayward Duffield; October 2, 1869; Adrian, Michigan, U.S.
- Died: January 8, 1926 (aged 56); New York, U.S.
- Resting place: Green-Wood Cemetery
- Education: Bishopthorpe School, Bethlehem, Pennsylvania
- Occupation(s): Author, anti-suffragist
- Spouse: Frank J. Goodwin
- Children: Mary Duffield Goodwin (1898–1976), Faith Holloway Goodwin (1904–1976)
- Parent(s): Samuel Willoughby Duffield and Harriet Hayward Duffield

Grace Duffield Goodwin (October 2, 1869 – January 8, 1926) was an American anti-suffrage activist, writer, and poet.

Served as president of the District of Columbia Anti-Suffrage Association and holding a position on the executive committee of the National Association Opposed to Woman Suffrage. Her contributions to the movement included public speaking, writing influential articles, and engaging in debates. Goodwin also authored the treatise Anti-Suffrage: Ten Good Reasons in 1914, in which she argued against women's suffrage, advocating for traditional gender roles and the idea that women were better suited to the domestic sphere.

Alongside her activism, Goodwin was a prolific writer, contributing to various newspapers, magazines, and literary publications. Her literary works included poetry and essays that explored themes of suburban life, nature, and societal roles.

== Early life and education ==
Grace Duffield was born on October 2, 1869, in Adrian, Michigan, to Reverend Samuel Willoughby Duffield and Harriet Hayward Duffield. She attended Bishopthorpe Seminary in South Bethlehem, Pennsylvania, and later pursued additional courses at Pembroke College, the women's college affiliated with Brown University.

== Anti-Suffrage advocacy ==
Grace Duffield Goodwin played a significant role in the anti-suffrage movement by actively participating in and supporting anti-suffrage campaigns. She served as the president of the District of Columbia Anti-Suffrage Association and was a member of the executive committee of the National Association Opposed to Woman Suffrage.

In 1912, she was the chairman of the District of Columbia Auxiliary of the National Association Opposed to Woman Suffrage.

Goodwin participated in a notable suffrage debate against Carrie Chapman Catt during the City Club's fifth season in 1913–14. This debate was a significant event, attracting a large audience and contributing to the club's prominence in political and social discourse.

She was featured as a speaker at various anti-suffrage events, including mass meetings in Utica and Gloversville, where she worked alongside other prominent anti-suffragists like Alice Hay Wadsworth. Goodwin's involvement included public speaking and participating in organized efforts to sway public opinion against women's enfranchisement. Her efforts extended to responding to the shifting political climate during World War I, particularly the framing of suffrage as a "war measure," which she and her fellow anti-suffragists opposed.

Goodwin's article, "The 'Feminist' Woman — A Thorough Radical Who Repudiates All Restraint," published in The New York Times on November 9, 1913, Goodwin critiqued the use of the term "feminist" in contemporary discourse. She argued that "feminist" had come to signify the most radical and revolutionary women who rejected traditional customs, social norms, and moral limitations. Goodwin distinguished between feminists and suffragists, suggesting that while all feminists are suffragists, not all suffragists are feminists. She criticized the feminist movement as overly radical and dangerous, asserting that it aimed to liberate women from all forms of restraint, extending beyond just the suffrage movement.

Goodwin argued that feminists were mentally defective, comparing their intellectual capabilities to that of an eleven-year-old. She suggested that adopting feminist ideals would increase women's risk of psychiatric disorders by 25%, based on the assumption that public life would exacerbate their supposed mental and emotional vulnerabilities.

Goodwin, along with other anti-suffrage activists, utilized medical language to reinforce their arguments. They claimed that women's so-called "temperamental disabilities," lack of "endurance in things mental," and insufficient "nervous stability" would lead to debilitation if they engaged in public life. This rhetoric was used to argue that women required special care and education, as opposed to participating equally in society. This view was rooted in the belief that women's supposed disabilities justified their exclusion from public life, and that only medical experts could properly address these issues.

=== Anti-Suffrage: Ten Good Reasons (1915) ===
In 1914, she contended that government stability relied on physical enforcement, which women were not involved in, and claimed that suffrage was a matter of policy, not a fundamental right. Goodwin believed that the push for women's suffrage came from a minority and would only worsen political corruption. She argued that women had advanced significantly without the vote and were more effective as political outsiders. Her views were grounded in a belief that suffrage would disrupt natural gender roles, fail to improve public morals, and diminish women's existing privileges.

Goodwin argued that women's natural role in the home and motherhood justified their exclusion from politics. She asserted that engaging in political activities would overstrain women's already taxed nervous systems, particularly during periods of reproductive activity. Goodwin's perspective contributed to the protectionist agenda that reinforced the notion of women's domestic confinement and excluded them from political participation.

== Literary contributions ==
Goodwin was a prolific writer who appeared in many different mediums such as newspapers, magazines and books. Such as The New York Times, The Century Illustrated Monthly Magazine, The Sunday Times, Good Housekeeping, and Scribner's Monthly.

=== The Commuter's Wife (1909) ===
In the context of suburbanization and its impact on middle-class housewives, Goodwin's article The Commuter's Wife: A Sisterly Talk by One Who Knows Her Problems, (Jan 1909) reflects her nuanced view on suburban life. She described the suburbs as "Lonelyville," acknowledging the isolation and lack of companionship but also recognized the advantages of suburban living, such as increased privacy and a more manageable household environment compared to urban settings. Goodwin's appraisal suggests that while suburban life could be lonely, it also offered a degree of independence and comfort not available in more densely populated areas.

=== Poetry ===
Goodwin contributed poetry to notable literary publications. Her work was featured alongside other prominent poets such as William H. Thompson, Charles Henry Crandall, Alice Williams Brotherton, Charles G. D. Roberts, and Robert Underwood Johnson. Her poetry appeared in a periodical published by The Century Company.

An Eastern Legend is a poem by Goodwin, featured in the collection The Emerald Story Book: Stories and Legends of Spring, Nature and Easter (1915).

Goodwin's Horizon Songs (1912), published by Sherman, French & Co., is a collection of short poems and songs categorized into themes of Nature, Childhood, Love, Life, and Death.

== Other affiliations ==
She also engaged in Bible study, missionary work, and supported efforts for emigrants and young girls. She was a member of the Washington Literary Society and the Rhode Island Short Story Club. A Congregationalist, Goodwin was actively involved in her faith community.

== Marriage and children ==
Grace Duffield Goodwin married Frank Judson Goodwin on November 11, 1891. Together, they had three children: Mary Duffield Goodwin (1898–1976), Faith Holloway Goodwin (1904–1976)

Her husband, Frank J. Goodwin is widely recognized for his book, A Harmony of the Life of St. Paul (1895).

In 1897, the family lived in Glen Ridge, New Jersey. As of 1914 was located in Washington, D.C.

== Death ==
Goodwin died on January 8, 1926. Her funeral services were held on January 11, 1932, at 2 p.m. at the Chapel of the Central Congregational Church, located on Hancock Street near Franklin Avenue, Brooklyn. She was buried at Green-Wood Cemetery in Brooklyn, New York.
