= Battle of the Aguadores =

- Part of the Spanish–American War
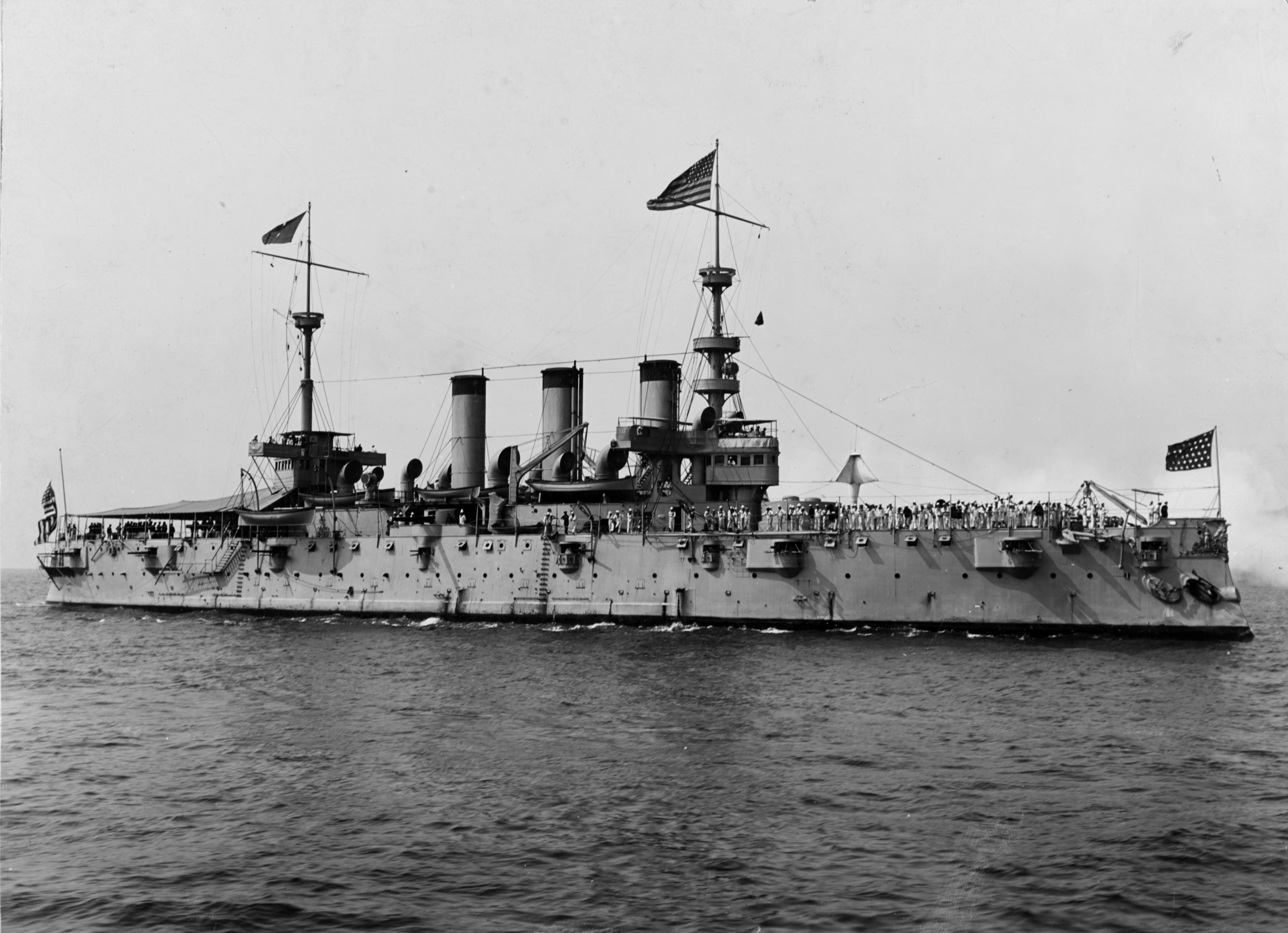
- USS New York, circa 1898
Date	1 July 1898
Location	Near Santiago de Cuba, Cuba
Result	Spanish victory

Belligerents
Spain	United States; Cuban rebels

Commanders and leaders
Unknown	Henry Duffield; William Sampson

Strength
274	2,700; 1 armoured cruiser 2 gunboats

Casualties and losses
None	10 killed & wounded

The Battle of the Aguadores was a sharp skirmish on the banks of the Aguadores River near Santiago de Cuba, on 1 July 1898, at the height of the Spanish–American War. The American attack was intended as a feint to draw Spanish defenders away from their nearby positions at San Juan Hill and El Caney, where the main blows fell later that day.

Poor coordination between Duffield's column and the North Atlantic Fleet led to an ineffective bombardment of the Spanish positions. By the time the Americans arrived, the west end of the only bridge had been dismantled and the river gorge was impassable. Seven hundred men of the 33rd Michigan Regiment pressed the attack on land but proved unable to close on the Spanish positions. Spanish rifle fire checked the American advance at the river crossing and Duffield, sustaining casualties from accurate small-arms fire, called off the attack and withdrew to Siboney.

The Spanish did not shift any forces from Santiago to Aguadores after all. While the Secretary of the Army declared the feint prevented the reinforcement of the San Juan Heights, no evidence was found to support this claim.

== Battle ==
Transport in the heavily wooded coastal area proved inadequate, and the National Guard of the 33rd Michigan had to take the train twice to within 1 mi (1.6 km) of the river. 1st and 2nd Battalions could not both fit on the train at the same time. The resulting noise to their front that early in the morning alerted the Spanish that an attack was forthcoming.

The morning attack began with a naval artillery barrage from a small squadron off the coast. At 09:00, the armored cruiser USS New York opened fire, followed by two smaller cruisers, USS Suwanee and USS Gloucester. A chance shot from Suwanee struck down the banner atop the small Spanish fort, but the naval bombardment otherwise had little material effect; with no way to adjust the fire onto the rifle pits below the crest or on the fortified houses on top, no targets could be hit. Spanish artillery units hunkered down and waited out the naval gunfire.

Spanish gunfire from modern Mauser rifles supported by directed artillery, meanwhile, bit into the approaching American infantry, which halted on the east bank above its objective of the railroad bridge near the Morro batteries. In the cover of the brush above the river, the Americans' .45-70 Trapdoor Springfields gave away their position every time they fired, in contrast to the Spanish, who enjoyed smokeless powder weapons.

Brigadier General Duffield kept up a desultory fire for much of the afternoon. Unable to advance any further, and not knowing if they had drawn off any defenders from the Santiago Heights, he ordered his men to break off at 13:30. They had drawn rations and ammunition at 01:30. and had been continuously moving or fighting in the thick brush since. The first to leave, as always in the U.S. military, were the wounded on the first train out.
