= John Gibson Parkhurst =

American diplomat

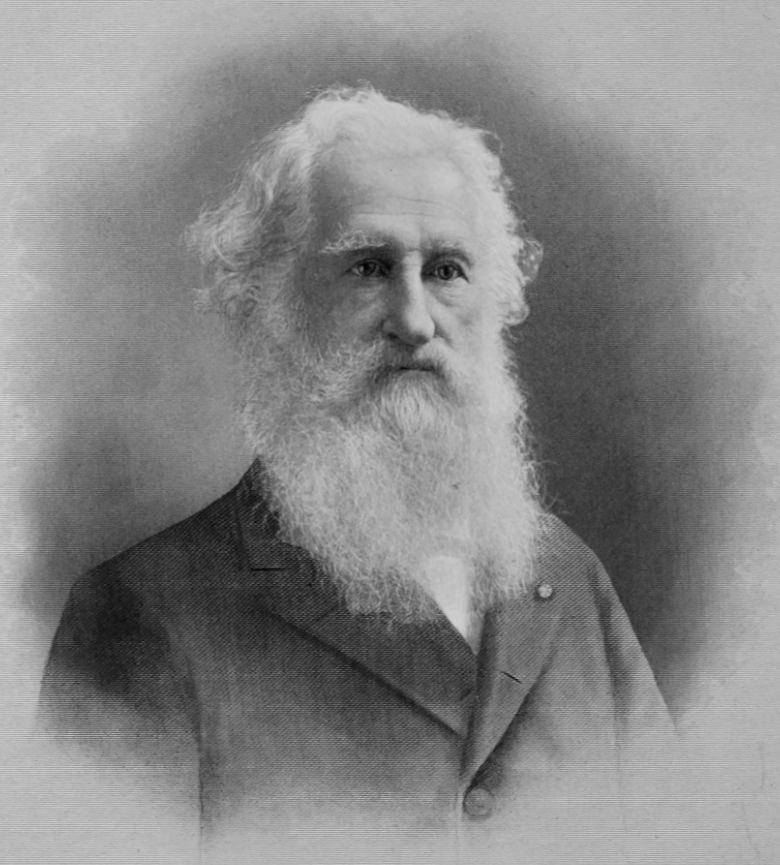
- Born: April 17, 1824; Oneida Castle, New York, US
- Died: May 6, 1906 (aged 82); Coldwater, Michigan, US
- Education: Oneida Academy
- Occupations: Lawyer; military officer; diplomat
- Spouses: Amelia Noyes (m. 1852; died 1861) Josie B. Reeves (m. 1863; died 1871) Frances J. Fiske (m. 1874–1900)
- Children: 2

Signature
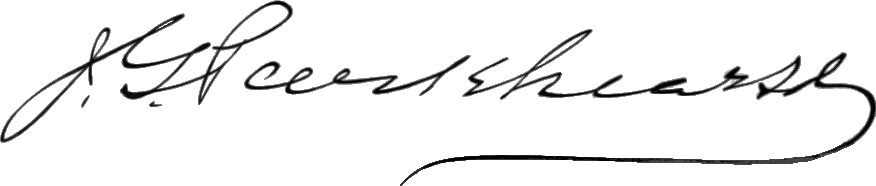

John Gibson Parkhurst (April 17, 1824 – May 6, 1906) was an American lawyer, an officer in the Union Army during the American Civil War, and later a diplomat.

== Biography ==
He was born in Oneida Castle, New York on April 17, 1824, the youngest of eight children of Stephen and Sally (née Gibson) Parkhurst. One of his older siblings died before he was born.

After graduating from the Oneida Academy, he studied law, and was admitted to the bar in New York in 1847. He practiced for two years before moving to Michigan in 1849, where he continued to work as a lawyer until 1861.

Parkhurst served as colonel of the 9th Michigan Volunteer Infantry Regiment during the Civil War, and became Provost Marshal General for the Department of the Cumberland. He was brevetted to brigadier general when the war ended. The lawyer served as United States Marshal for the Eastern District of Michigan from 1866 to 1869 and United States Minister to Belgium from 1888 to 1889.

He married Amelia Noyes in 1852, and they had two daughters. His wife died on July 26, 1861, and he remarried to Josie B. Reeves in 1863. She died in 1871, and he married Frances J. Fiske (née Roberts) in 1874. She died in 1900.

John Gibson Parkhurst died at his home in Coldwater, Michigan on May 6, 1906.

Preceded by Lambert Tree	United States Envoy Extraordinary and Minister Plenipotentiary to Belgium; 1888–1889	Succeeded by Edwin H. Terrell
