= George James Webb =

English-American composer (1803–1887)

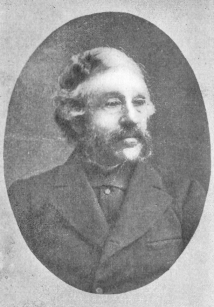
George James Webb

George James Webb (June 24, 1803 - October 7, 1887) was an English-born American composer, conductor, music educator, and organist. He was known for writing "Stand Up, Stand Up for Jesus". Webb composed the hymn-tune known as "Webb" whilst sailing from England to the United States: the tune is also known as "Morning Light".

== Life and career ==
George James Webb was born in Salisbury, Wiltshire, England on June 24, 1803. He trained as a musician in his native city under Alexander Lucas, and began his career as an organist in Falmouth, Cornwall. In 1830 he resigned his post and immigrated to the United States where he initially settled in Boston, Massachusetts as the organist at Old South Church.

In Boston, Webb taught on the faculty of the Boston Academy of Music where he was conductor of the school's orchestra. He also worked as conductor of both the Handel and Haydn Society and The Musical Fund Society. He became a protege of Lowell Mason, and collaborated with him on a variety of music, education, and publication projects; including co-editing music periodicals together and building choral collections together. Webb's daughter married Mason's son, the composer William Mason.

In 1870 Webb moved to Orange, New Jersey where he lived until his death in that city on October 7, 1887. He spent his final years teaching in New York City, and is buried in Orange at Rosedale Cemetery.
