= Battle of Fitzhugh's Woods =

Civil War Battle near Augusta, Arkansas

- Part of American Civil War and the Camden Expedition
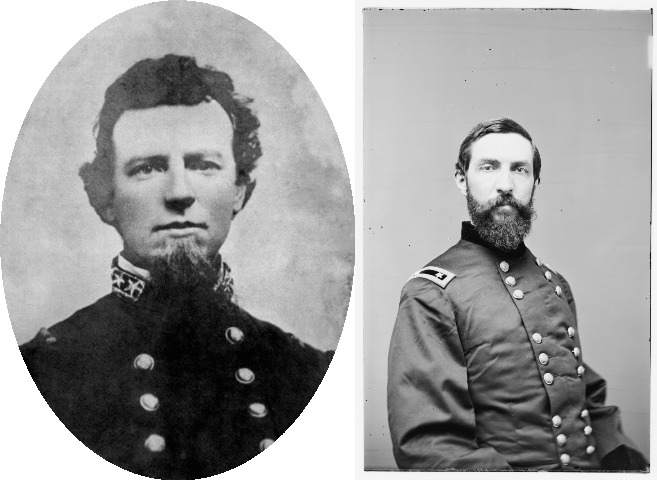
- Dandridge McRae (left) and Christopher Columbus Andrews (right)
Date	April 1, 1864
Location	Near Augusta, Arkansas 35°20.903′N 91°19.351′W
Result	Union victory

Belligerents
United States (Union)	(Confederate States of America) Confederate States

Commanders and leaders
(United States) Christopher C. Andrews; Everett W. Foster	(Confederate States of America) Dandridge McRae; Thomas R. Freeman

Units involved
Companies B, C, E, G, H, and I of the 3rd Minnesota Infantry Regiment; Company E of the 8th Missouri Cavalry Regiment	Various Confederate cavalry units, Partisan Rangers, and mounted infantry

Strength
231	545

Casualties and losses
7-8 Killed, 16 Wounded, 4-5 Captured, 1 Missing	Between 20-25 Killed, between 60-75 Wounded, 13 Captured

The Battle of Fitzhugh's Woods, also called the Action at Fitzhugh's Woods, the Battle of Fitzhugh's Farm, or the Battle of Fitzhugh's Plantation, was fought on April 1, 1864 near Augusta, Arkansas as part of the Western theater of the American Civil War. The battle was fought between combined irregular cavalry and mounted infantry forces under Brigadier General Dandridge McRae against a detachment of the 3rd Minnesota Infantry Regiment and the 8th Missouri Cavalry Regiment led by Colonel Christopher Columbus Andrews. The battle derives its name from the nearby plantation owned by Virginia planter and slaveowner Rufus King Fitzhugh (1816-1888).

== Opposing forces ==
=== Confederate ===
McRae had been given command of all Confederate forces between the White River and the Mississippi River in Arkansas. At the time McRae's force consisted of various companies of Confederate irregular cavalry and some infantry forces including:

- 35 men of Company D, 37th Arkansas Infantry Regiment - Captain John Bland †
- Roughly 400 Missourians from Freeman's Regiment of Missouri Cavalry - Col. Thomas R. Freeman
- 60 Arkansas Partisans of the 1st Arkansas Cavalry - Captain George Wherry Rutherford
- 30 men of the Independent "Popcorn Company", later part of the 28th Arkansas Cavalry Regiment - Captain Samuel Jordan McGuffin (WIA)
- 50 men under Captain Jesse Tracy
- 20 men under Captain Reynolds

According to most sources, McRae's command at Fitzhugh's Woods would only consist of about 545 men in total.

=== Union ===
Andrew's detachment consisted of two infantry battalions and roughly a half-company of 45 cavalry troopers.

- Roughly 186 men from companies B, C, E, G, H, and I of the 3rd Minnesota Infantry Regiment - Col. Christopher Columbus Andrews and Maj. Everett W. Foster
- 45 cavalry troopers of the 8th Missouri Cavalry Regiment - Captain Luther J. Matthews

== Battle ==
On March 31, 1864, Colonel Andrews' detachment of the 3rd Minnesota along with Captain Matthew's 8th Missouri Cavalry left DeValls Bluff, Arkansas and boarded the riverboat Dove with an escort from the gunboat Covington and proceeded up the Mississippi River towards a ford known as Gregory's Landing. While at Gregory's Landing, Andrews questioned several civilians and later ascertained that there were Confederate guerillas in the region commanded by McRea. Andrews' sent a portion of his cavalry to reconnoiter in the direction of Straight Lake just south of Augusta, Arkansas.

The next day, Andrews' detachment learned that McRea's main encampment was roughly 7–8 miles north of Augusta. They set out and had not gone far on the road outside of Augusta when they encountered McRae's cavalry pickets which rushed back to the main body. Andrews' cavalry pursued the fleeing pickets and captured two of them. As Major Foster's infantry of the 3rd Minnesota linked up with Captain Matthews' 8th Missouri Cavalry, Andrews' detachment was abruptly attacked by Confederate Captain George Wherry Rutherford. Major Foster, with three companies of the 3rd Minnesota, repulsed Rutherford's cavalry charge. In the meantime, Colonel Andrews deployed several companies on a flanking maneuver along the Jacksonport Road where he encountered McRea himself watering his horse in the vicinity of the nearby Antony farm. McRea fled towards the McCoy's residence to the east, seeing McRea's unit fleeing Andrews decided to not pursue. Andrews' men made use of captured Confederate wagons at McRea's abandoned camp which were filled with ham.

Andrews' column rested at a nearby plantation owned by Rufus King Fitzhugh. Just when the 3rd Minnesota began to eat their rations for lunch, they were charged by McRae's cavalrymen. Andrews' force put up a brief skirmish before retreating towards the woods near the Fitzhugh plantation; there, they were attacked from three sides in a double envelopment. Despite McRae's overwhelming cavalry force of roughly 545 men Andrews did not retreat. For roughly three hours both sides traded small arms fire with one another before Andrews was able to successfully cross a bayou to the south and withdraw from the field. McRae was not able to pursue Andrews' troops as they were only armed with revolvers and were extremely low on ammunition from the three hour-long battle.

According to Minnesota historian and author Joseph C. Fitzharris, Professor Emeritus of History at the University of St. Thomas in St. Paul, Minnesota, Colonel Willis Ponder of the 12th Missouri Infantry Regiment later remarked that the 3rd Minnesotans were “the hardest lot of men…that he ever ran against".

== Casualties ==
Estimates of casualties vary during the battle on both sides dependent on the source. The official battlefield marker and the general consensus states that the 3rd Minnesota Infantry suffered the loss of 7 men killed in action, 16 wounded, and 4 wounded who were left behind on the battlefield. The 8th Missouri Cavalry saw one man killed and one missing in action. The Minnesota Historical Society states that the 3rd Minnesota lost 7 men killed and 28 wounded.

McRae's Confederate forces saw 20-25 men killed or mortally wounded and a further roughly 60-75 wounded. Although some estimates, such as the Arkansas Civil War battlefield marker states that upwards of 100 men from Andrew's cavalry force were killed and wounded. The Minnesota Historical Society meanwhile, argues that Confederate losses were between 60 to 75 wounded and 20 to 25 killed, with the 3rd Minnesota capturing 1 officer, 1 sergeant, and 11 enlisted men besides their casualties.

== Legacy ==
A commemorative plaque marking the site of the battle was placed in Augusta, Arkansas in 2013 by the Arkansas Humanities Council and the National Endowment for the Humanities, with the help of the Arkansas Civil War Sesquicentennial Commission, the city government of Augusta, Preserve America, the National Park Service, and the United States Department of the Interior. The marker is located at the intersection of Arkansas Highway 33 and Woodruff Road (County Road 165). According to The Division of Arkansas Heritage, the Battle of Fitzhugh's Woods is the largest battle from the American Civil War to occur in Woodruff County, Arkansas.
