= Samuel Willoughby Duffield =

American poet

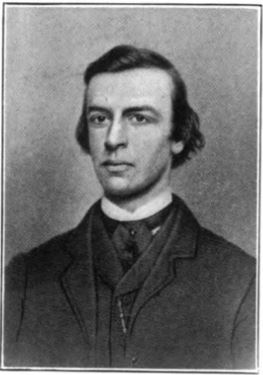
- Born: September 24, 1843; Brooklyn
- Died: May 12, 1887 (aged 43); Bloomfield
- Education: Yale College
- Occupations: Clergyman, author
- Spouse: Hattie Haywood (m. 1868)
- Parent(s): George Duffield V, Anna Augusta Willoughby

Samuel Augustus Willoughby Duffield (September 24, 1843 – May 12, 1887) was an American clergyman and author.

== Biography ==
Duffield, the eldest child of the Rev. Dr. George Duffield (Yale 1837) and Anna Augusta (Willoughby) Duffield, was born in Brooklyn, N. Y., September 24, 1843. He entered Yale College from Philadelphia, but before his graduation his father had accepted a call to Adrian, Mich., and there the son taught school for a few months and then entered on the study of theology under his father's direction. He was licensed to preach in April 1866, and for the latter half of the same year had charge of a mission enterprise in Chicago. He then spent six months in New York and Philadelphia, engaged in study and preaching. He was ordained and installed, November 12, 1867, as pastor of the Kenderton Presbyterian Church in Philadelphia, from which he removed in 1870 to a brief pastorate in Jersey City, N. J. In the fall of 1871, he became pastor of the 1st Presbyterian Church, Ann Arbor, Mich., which he left in November, 1874, for the 8th Presbyterian Church in Chicago. This charge he resigned, October 1, 1876, and went to Auburn, N. Y., as acting pastor of the Central Presbyterian Church. Having terminated this relation on May 1, 1878, he was installed over the 2nd Presbyterian Church in Altoona, Pa., in October of the same year. From Altoona he went in 1881 to the Westminster Presbyterian Church, Bloomfield, N J., of which he remained the beloved pastor until his death. He suffered from disease of the heart, and was laid aside from active work in the summer of 1886, with no reasonable hope of recovery. He died in Bloomfield on May 12, 1887, in his 44th year.

== Family life ==
He married on October 1, 1868, Hattie S., daughter of Isaac Haywood, of Adrian, Mich, who survived him with their two children, a daughter (Grace Duffield Goodwin) and a son.

== Publications ==
Duffield's publications include Warp and Woof, a book of verse (N.Y., 1870, pp. 188, 12mo.), and an elaborate work on the history of hymnology, entitled English Hymns: their Authors and History (N Y, 1886, pp. 675, 8vo.).
