= Thomas R. Freeman =

"Confederate Brigadier General", "Missouri Lawyer"

Thomas Roe Freeman
- Born: February 22, 1829; Benton, Missouri
- Died: February 28, 1893 (aged 64); Neosho, Missouri
- Burial place: Odd Fellows Cemetery; Neosho, Missouri
- Spouse(s): Mary C. "Polly" Lamb; Olive E. Fuller
- Children: 4
- Military career
- Allegiance: (Confederate States of America) Confederate States
- Branch: Missouri State Guard (Confederate States of America) Confederate States Army
- Service years: 1861-1865
- Rank: Brigadier General
- Commands: Freeman's Brigade; Freeman's Missouri Cavalry Regiment
- Conflicts: American Civil War

Thomas Roe Freeman (February 22, 1829 - February 28, 1893) was a Missouri lawyer, judge, and Brigadier General in the Confederate States Army during the American Civil War in the Trans-Mississippi Theater. During the war Freeman led "Freeman's Brigade", a cavalry brigade under the command of John S. Marmaduke's 1st Division.

== Early life ==
Thomas Roe Freeman was born on February 22, 1829 in Benton, Missouri. He was the son of Reverend James R. Freeman and Rebecca Roberts. Freeman worked in a variety of trades growing up including as a blacksmith and livestock trader. Shortly before the American Civil War Freeman worked as a lawyer in Dent County, Missouri and Phelps County, Missouri where he was the Associate Justice of the Phelps County court.

== American Civil War ==
At the outbreak of the American Civil War Freeman enlisted into the ranks of Wingo's Cavalry from Dent County which was part of the Missouri State Guard under the command of Captain Edmund Thomas Wingo. Freeman was later elected as the Colonel of the 6th Regiment of the 7th Division of the Missouri State Guard. Freeman was captured and held as a prisoner of war on February 14, 1862 following the Battle of Crane Creek, a small skirmish during the broader Pea Ridge Campaign. Freeman was held as a POW at the Alton Military Prison in Alton, Illinois until he was paroled in a prisoner exchange later on September 23, 1862.

Freeman later joined the 12th Missouri Cavalry Battalion where he patrolled and skirmished with Union forces in Independence County, Arkansas, as well as Carroll County, Marion County, and Searcy County under the command of Sterling Price. On December 25, 1863 Colonel Robert Ramsey Livingston of the 1st Nebraska Cavalry Regiment was eventually tasked with capturing Freeman and his cavalry raiders in a punitive expedition from Batesville, Arkansas. Livingston was successful in capturing several of Freeman's men, but not Freeman himself. In the meantime, Freeman eluded capture by the 1st Nebraska Cavalry until his unit confronted the 1st Nebraska near Pocahontas, Missouri and engaged in a skirmish which the Union units lost 8 men killed, 1 wounded, and 31 captured.

=== Freeman's Brigade ===
On January 26, 1864 Freeman reorganized the 12th Missouri Cavalry Battalion into Freeman's Missouri Cavalry Regiment (sometimes called Freeman's Brigade) which was a reorganized regiment consisting of men who had previously belonged to the 2nd Arkansas Cavalry Regiment, the 1st Missouri Cavalry Regiment, and Slayback's Missouri Cavalry Regiment. Portions of Freeman's regiment took part in the Battle of Fitzhugh's Woods near Augusta, Arkansas in Woodruff County on April 1, 1864 during the Camden Expedition. Freeman's Brigade also took part in Price's Missouri Expedition, most notably at the Battle of Westport on October 23, 1864 under the command of John S. Marmaduke and Sterling Price. Freeman's Regiment eventually surrendered and were paroled in 1865.

== Postwar career ==
Following the war Freeman continued his antebellum career as a lawyer, serving as a prosecuting attorney for Jacksonport, Arkansas, Rolla, Missouri, Shannon County, Missouri, and Newton County, Missouri. Freeman died on February 28, 1893 at the age of 64. He is buried in the Odd Fellows Cemetery in Neosho, Missouri.
