= George Duffield (minister, born 1794) =

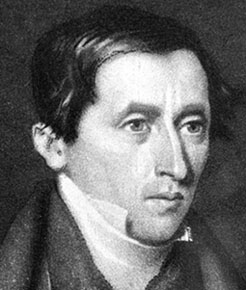
- Born: 4 July 1794; Strasburg, Pennsylvania
- Died: 26 June 1868 (aged 73); Detroit, Michigan
- Occupation: Pastor
- Notable work: "Regeneration"
- Spouse: Isabella Graham Bethune
- Children: William, Henry, and George V
- Theological work
- Language: English
- Tradition or movement: Presbyterian

George Duffield (July 4, 1794 - June 26, 1868) was a leading nineteenth-century New School Presbyterian minister who bore the same name as his father and grandfather. His evolution from unconventional doctrinal leanings to more orthodox and standard ones typified the moderation on both sides which led to reunion with the Old School Presbyterians in 1870.

Duffield's grandfather, George Duffield II, had been Chaplain of the Continental Congress. Born July 4, 1794, in Strasburg, Pennsylvania, to a second George Duffield and his wife Faithful Slaymaker (a younger sister of Amos Slaymaker). He was the father of William Ward Duffield, Henry M. Duffield, and George Duffield V.

Duffield graduated from the University of Pennsylvania in 1811. He studied theology in New York City under the preceptorship of John M. Mason and was licensed to preach by the Presbytery of Philadelphia in 1815. He soon settled in Carlisle, Pennsylvania, where he ministered nineteen years. There he wrote and published a book entitled "Regeneration" which caused some of the controversy leading to the Old School-New School Controversy that split the church in 1837.

Duffield was called as minister to Fifth Presbyterian Church in Philadelphia, Pennsylvania, where he stayed two years. Then, after passing one year in the ministry at Broadway Tabernacle Church in New York City, as co-pastor with Jacob Helffenstein and successor to Charles Finney, he accepted a call to the First Presbyterian Church in Detroit, Michigan, then called the "Protestant" church. There he grew disenchanted with the revivalist techniques of Finney and began to oppose his ministry. In 1847 he led the Detroit Presbytery to adopt a statement which censured Finney, entitled "A Warning Against Error." In 1848, Finney published his 47 page response, "A Reply to Dr. Duffield's Warning Against Error."

Duffield also was a leading Presbyterian premillennialist, and in 1842 authored, Dissertations on the prophecies relative to the second coming of Jesus Christ.

He was appointed to the Board of Regents of the University of Michigan on which he served ten years. His influence extended over the whole state of Michigan and made use of the press as well as the pulpit. He was learned in Latin, Greek, Hebrew, French, and German as well as English. He was a master of the sciences and had an unfailing memory.

Duffield died as he had wished, "in the harness," two days after addressing the 1868 International Convention of the Young Men's Christian Association at Detroit, where he paused suddenly, in the midst of his address, and fell with a cry of distress into the arms of those standing near him. His death was mourned throughout Detroit.

== Bibliography ==
- Presbyterian Reunion: A Memorial Volume (1837–1871), DeWitt C. Lent & Company, 1870.
- Hambrick-Stowe, Charles E., Charles G. Finney and the Spirit of American Evangelicalism, 1996.
- Duffield, George, Regeneration, 1832.

Religious titles
Preceded by The Rev. Jonathan Bailey Condit	Moderator of the 68th General Assembly (New School) of the Presbyterian Church in the United States of America; 1862–1863	Succeeded by The Rev. Henry B. Smith
