= Chauncey Wright Griggs =

American military officer and politician

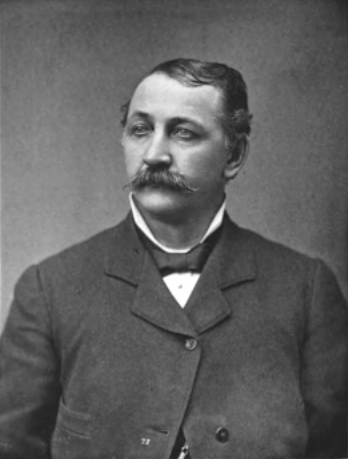
- Griggs c. 1884

Member of the Minnesota Legislature
- In office January 2, 1866 – January 3, 1870

Member of the Minnesota Senate
- In office January 4, 1881 – January 3, 1887

Personal details
- Born: December 31, 1832 Tolland, Connecticut, U.S.
- Died: October 29, 1910 (aged 77) Tacoma, Washington, U.S.
- Resting place: Tacoma Cemetery; Tacoma, Washington, U.S.
- Other political affiliations: Democrat
- Education: Monson Academy
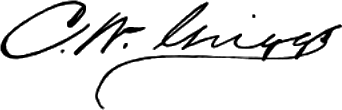
- Signature

Military service
- Allegiance: United States of America
- Branch/service: (United States) Union Army
- Years of service: 1861-1865
- Rank: Colonel
- Unit: 3rd Minnesota Infantry Regiment
- Battles/wars: American Civil War

Chauncey Wright Griggs (December 31, 1832 – October 29, 1910) was an American military officer and politician.

== Early life ==
Chauncey Wright Griggs was born on December 31, 1832, in Tolland, Connecticut, the 4th child and youngest son of farmer Chauncey Griggs and his wife, Hearty Dimock. In 1846 or 1847, at age 14, he went to work for his oldest brother, Stephen, in Birmingham, Ohio. This arrangement, however, "did not prove wholly congenial," and, after only a "few months" working for Stephen, Chauncey returned to the family home in Tolland, Connecticut. He attended high school at Monson Academy, graduating in 1850 or 1851.

After graduation, Chauncey lived in several states, held a variety of jobs and attended a "commercial" college in Detroit, Michigan. On May 4, 1856, Chauncey arrived in St. Paul, Minnesota, where he would reside for the next 32 years.

== Military ==
Chauncey enlisted as a Captain in the 3rd Minnesota Infantry Regiment on November 11, 1861 and was promoted several times, holding the rank of Colonel at the time of his resignation, due to health issues, on July 19, 1863. He was held for "several" months at a Confederate prison in Madison, Georgia and "for a brief period" at Libby Prison in Richmond, Virginia after his regiment surrendered, despite his opposition which he expressed in "strong terms," on July 10 or 13, 1862 in Murfreesboro, Tennessee.

== Political career ==
Chauncey first held political office when he was elected as a district representative of Carver County, Minnesota to the Minnesota House of Representatives in 1865. Chauncey served in this position from 1866 to 1867. From 1876 to 1881, he was an alderman from the 4th ward of St. Paul, Minnesota. He served as a Democrat on the Minnesota Senate from 1866 to 1870 and 1881-1887 and was appointed to the St. Paul, Minnesota water board in 1882.

== Personal life ==
On April 9, 1859, he married Martha Gallup in Ledyard, Connecticut. Chauncey and Martha had 6 children together, 4 sons and 2 daughters, all of whom were born in Minnesota: Chauncey, Herbert, Heartie, Everett, Theodore and Anna.

== Later life and death ==
Chauncey and his family moved from St. Paul, Minnesota to Tacoma, Washington in 1888. He and several other wealthy lumbermen purchased land from the Northern Pacific Railroad Company in 1887 to form the St. Paul and Tacoma Lumber Company, of which Chauncey was chosen to be president. Chauncey died on October 29, 1910, in Tacoma of paralysis at the age of 78 and is buried in Tacoma Cemetery.
