= 3rd Minnesota Infantry Regiment =

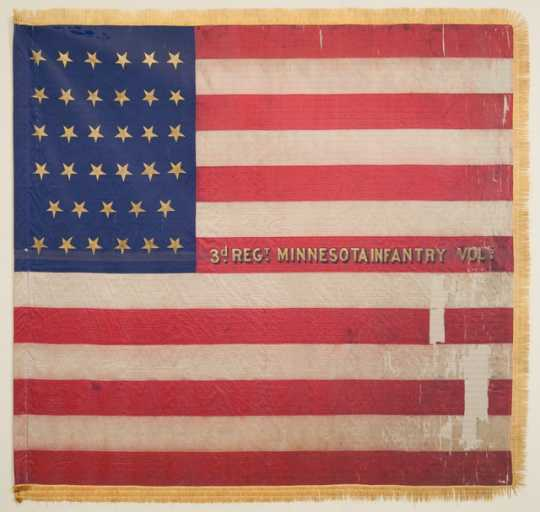
- 3rd Minnesota Infantry Regiment Battle Flag
- Active: Between October 2 and November 14, 1861, to September 16, 1865.
- Country: United States
- Allegiance: Union
- Branch: Infantry
- Engagements: American Civil War: Heartland Offensive; First Battle of Murfreesboro; Dakota War of 1862; Battle of Wood Lake; Vicksburg Campaign; Siege of Vicksburg; Little Rock Operations; Battle of Fitzhugh's Woods

Commanders
- Notable commanders: Henry C. Lester; Christopher C. Andrews; Chauncey W. Griggs; Hans Mattson

The 3rd Minnesota Infantry Regiment was a Minnesota USV infantry regiment that served in the Union army during the American Civil War. It fought in several campaigns in the Western Theater.

== Service ==
Company	Earliest Moniker	Primary Place of Recruitment	Earliest Captain
A	Minneapolis Guards	Hennepin County and Wright County	William W. Webster
B	Washington County Rifles	Washington County, Dakota County, Carver County, and Ramsey County	Chauncey Wright Griggs
C	Root River Rangers or Filmore County Volunteers	Fillmore County, Olmsted County, and Mower County	John A. Bennett
D	Scandinavian Guards	Goodhue County, Norway, and Sweden	Hans Mattson
E	Goodhue Rifles or Red Wing Volunteers	Goodhue County and Dodge County	Clinton Gurnee
F	Hastings Volunteers	Dakota County, Steele County, and Washington County	John B. Preston
G	Wabasha County Guards	Wabasha County	Everest W. Foster
H	Minnesota Rangers	Rice County and Blue Earth County	Benjamin F. Rice
I	Union Guards or Stearns County Guard	Le Sueur County, Stearns County, and Wabasha County	Christopher Columbus Andrews
K	Olmstead County Volunteers	Olmsted County and Winona County	Mark W. Clay

The 3rd Minnesota Infantry Regiment was mustered in by companies at Fort Snelling, Minnesota, between October 2 and November 14, 1861, and was sent to Kentucky on November 14, 1861. It remained on garrison duty in Kentucky and Tennessee until most of the men were captured by Nathan Bedford Forrest at Murfreesboro, Tennessee, on July 13, 1862. They were subsequently paroled and sent to Benton Barracks at St. Louis, Missouri, to await parole. Their commanding officer, Colonel Lester, and the other officers who voted for surrender were held accountable for the debacle at Murfreesboro and were dismissed from the service in December 1862. Further description of the surrender at Murfreesboro can be found in the papers of William D. Hale, a member of the 3rd Minnesota.

The regiment was formally exchanged on August 27, 1862, and moved home to Minnesota arriving at Fort Snelling on 4 September. On 12 September the Regiment joined Col H. H. Sibley at Fort Ridgely where it joined in the suppression of the Dakota War of 1862. In September the 3rd Minnesota participated in the defeat of the Sioux at the Battle of Wood Lake on September 23. At the end of the brief campaign, the regiment returned to Fort Snelling to board riverboats south. They were posted to garrison duty in Kentucky and Tennessee in January 1863. The Regiment remained there until joining in the Siege of Vicksburg until the surrender of the defenders on July 4, 1863. The regiment then participated in the campaign to capture Little Rock, Arkansas, from August 13 to September 10, 1863, and remained in garrison there after the fall of the city until April 28, 1864.

Enough of the soldiers of the regiment reenlisted in January 1864 to Veteranize it. Part of the 3rd Minnesota participated in an expedition up the White River to Augusta, Arkansas, from March 30 to April 3, 1864, culminating in the Battle of Fitzhugh's Woods on April 1, 1864. The regiment remained in various garrisons to the end of the war.

The 3rd Minnesota Infantry was discharged from service at Fort Snelling on September 16, 1865.

== Casualties ==
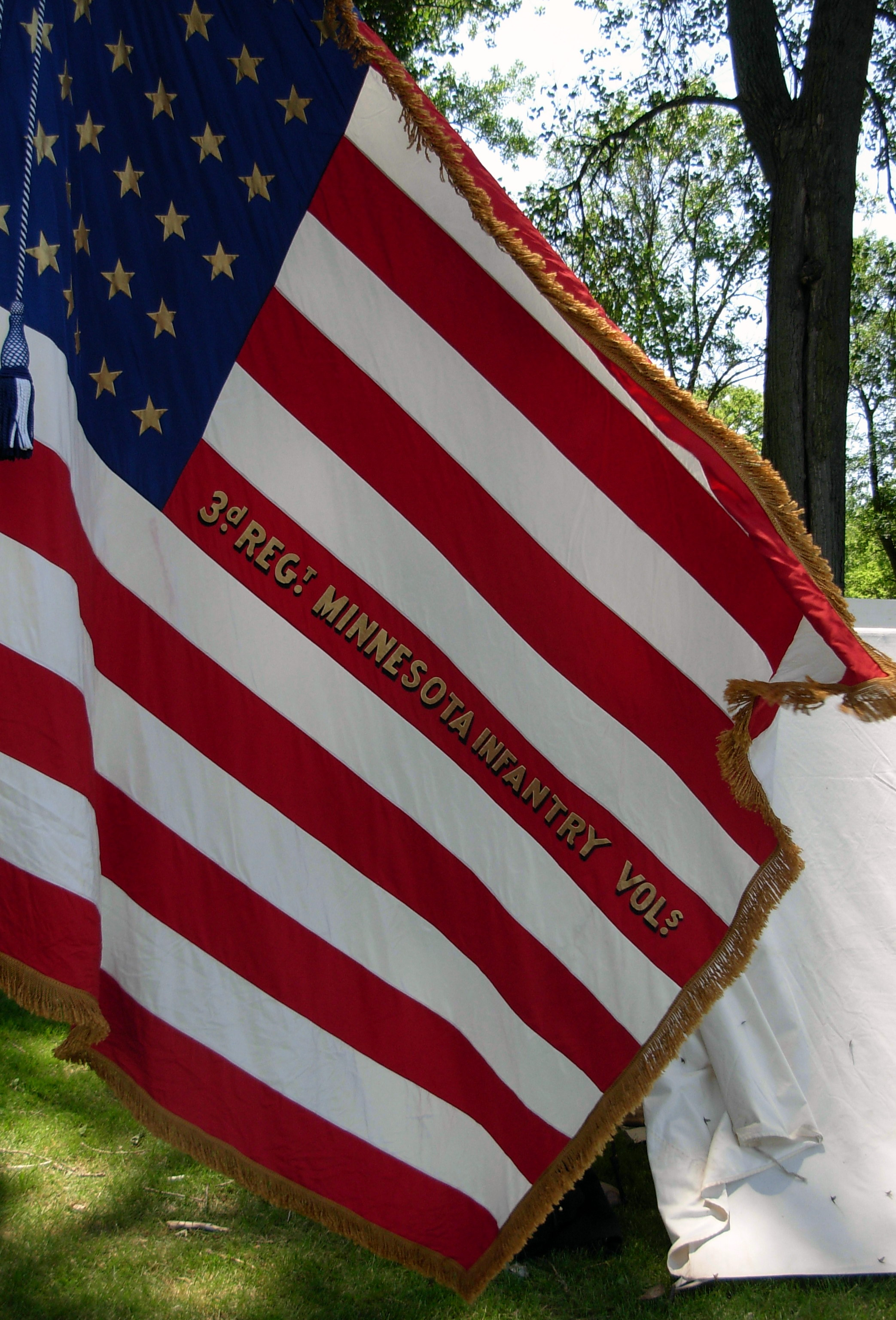
Reproduced regimental flag

The 3rd Minnesota Infantry suffered 17 enlisted men killed in action or who later died of their wounds, plus another 4 officers and 275 enlisted men who died of disease, for a total of 296 fatalities.

== Colonels ==
- Colonel Henry C. Lester – November 15, 1861, to December 1, 1862.
- Colonel Chauncey Wright Griggs – December 1, 1862, to July 15, 1863.
- Colonel Christopher C. Andrews – July 15, 1863, to June 13, 1864.
- Colonel Hans Mattson – June 13, 1864, to September 2, 1865.

== See also ==
List of Minnesota Civil War Units
