= First Battle of Murfreesboro =

1862 battle of the American Civil War

Coordinates: 35.847°N 86.393°W

- Part of the American Civil War
Date	July 13, 1862
Location	Rutherford County, Tennessee
Result	Confederate victory

Belligerents
United States (Union)	(Confederate States of America) CSA (Confederacy)

Commanders and leaders
(United States) Thomas Turpin Crittenden	(Confederate States of America) Nathan Bedford Forrest

Units involved
Murfreesboro Garrison	Forrest's Cavalry Brigade

Strength
814	1,400

Casualties and losses
15 killed 86 wounded 713 captured	25 killed 40–60 wounded

The First Battle of Murfreesboro was fought on July 13, 1862, in Rutherford County, Tennessee, as part of the American Civil War. Troops under Confederate cavalry commander Colonel Nathan Bedford Forrest surprised and quickly overran a Federal hospital, the camps of several small Union units, and the jail and courthouse in Murfreesboro, Tennessee. All of the Union units surrendered to Forrest, and the Confederates destroyed much of the Union's supplies and destroyed railroad track in the area. The primary consequence of the raid was the diversion of Union forces from a drive on Chattanooga.

== Background ==
On June 10, 1862, Union Maj. Gen. Don Carlos Buell, commanding the Army of the Ohio, started a leisurely advance toward Chattanooga. Brig. Gen. James S. Negley and his force threatened the city on June 7–8. In response to the threat, the Confederate government sent Brig. Gen. Nathan Bedford Forrest to Chattanooga to organize a cavalry brigade. By July, Confederate cavalry under the command of Forrest and Colonel John Hunt Morgan were raiding into Middle Tennessee and Kentucky.

Forrest left Chattanooga on July 9 with two cavalry regiments and joined other units on the way, bringing the total force to about 1,400 men. The major objective was to strike Murfreesboro, an important Union supply center on the Nashville & Chattanooga Railroad, at dawn on July 13.

== Opposing Forces ==
=== Union ===
Brig. Gen. Thomas T. Crittenden commanding the Murfreesboro garrison consisting of four units: one regiment of cavalry, two regiments of infantry, and a battery of artillery.

- 7th Pennsylvania Cavalry Regiment - Col. George C. Wynkoop
- 9th Michigan Infantry Regiment - Co. William W. Duffield
- 3rd Minnesota Infantry Regiment - Col. Henry C. Lester
- Battery B 1st Kentucky Light Artillery- Capt. John M. Hewitt

=== Confederate ===
Col. Nathan Bedford Forrest's cavalry brigade consisting of three cavalry units and two infantry battalions.

- 8th Texas Cavalry Regiment - Col. John Warton
- 1st Georgia Cavalry Battalion
- 2nd Georgia Cavalry Regiment - Col. William J. Lawton
- Two battalions of Tennessee and Kentucky infantry

== Battle ==
=== Woodbury Pike ===
The Murfreesboro garrison was camped in three locations around town: the 7th Pennsylvania and 9th Michigan infantry in the town and on the Woodbury Pike east of Murfreesboro and the 3rd Minnesota and Hewitt's Battery on Wilkinson's Pike west of the town. Brig. Gen. Thomas Turpin Crittenden, who had just arrived on July 12 took command of the garrison from Col. Lester of the 3rd Minnesota. Between 4:15 and 4:30 a.m. on the morning of July 13, a group of 15 cavalrymen avoided the midnight patrols and surprised the Union pickets on the Woodbury Pike, east of Murfreesboro. The firing did not ignite reaction from the units in and east of Murfreesboro, allowing Forrest to move on the town itself.

=== Attack on Murfreesboro ===
Confederate cavalry and infantry poured into the city streets in three columns. The first, under Col. John Warton of the 8th Texas Cavalry moved north to the Maney House and overran the 7th Pennsylvania Cavalry without inflicting or taking any casualties. The second column under Forrest and the 1st Georgia Cavalry rode to the city square and liberated the prisoners in the jail. The third column composed of the Col. William Lawton's 2nd Georgia Cavalry and the attached infantry battalions moved north to the Lebanon Pike and cut off an escape route for the 9th Michigan. The courthouse was set ablaze and the guards inside surrendered to put out the fire. Around this time, Brig Gen. Crittenden was awoken by Confederate cavalrymen and captured. Now being the highest-ranking officer inside Murfreesboro, Colonel Duffield gave Lt. Col. Parkhurst the command to form the 9th Michigan on their company streets as more enemy cavalry approached. Col. Duffield then ordered his men into square, which they were unable to execute under the awkward circumstances. Wharton's Texans struck the Michiganders, compelling them to withdraw to the fence line in front of the Maney House where they would hold their position against multiple attacks.

=== Attack on the Third Minnesota and artillery ===
Hearing the firing, Col. Lester had his regiment formed into line alongside Capt. Hewitt's Battery on a high ridge in front of the Murfree house northwest of the town. Advancing a quarter mile to the timber in front, Confederates of the 2nd Georgia Cavalry fired at the Minnesotans. Skirmishers on both sides exchanged fire as artillery from Hewitt's battery crashed into the woods. The 3rd's skirmishers fell back into line with the rest of the regiment, and the 2nd Georgia charged. However, the charge quickly dithered under the fire of Lester's men. Both sides proceeded to exchange shots once again. Colonel Lawton was impressed by the 3rd Minnesota, later remarking that "the enemy sharpshooters were quite effective".

Forrest, seeing that the Georgians were repulsed, gathered 200 men to instead attack the 3rd's camp, guarded by about 30 men under Cpl. Charles H. Green of Company I. Despite the difference in numbers, the first two assaults on the camp were repulsed; the third, however, overran it. An engaged Col. Lester was unable to provide support with infantry or artillery, so he sent scouts to the camp of the 9th Michigan. However, they were unable to bypass Col. Lawton's men on the pike. Another messenger, this time from the 9th Michigan, revealed to Col. Lester that the 9th was surrounded and needed relief. A second reconnaissance confirmed that the blocking forces were too large for the 3rd to break through. The Union troops continued to stave off rebel efforts and hold their ground until the late afternoon. The 3rd Minnesota and 9th Michigan then finally surrendered to Forrest.

== Aftermath ==
The Confederates destroyed much of the Union supplies and tore up railroad track in the area, but the main result of the raid was the diversion of Union forces from a drive on Chattanooga. This raid, along with Morgan's raid into Kentucky, made possible Bragg's concentration of forces at Chattanooga and his early September invasion of Kentucky. The next action at Murfreesboro was the more prominent Battle of Stones River (known as the Battle of Murfreesboro in the South), fought December 31, 1862, to January 2, 1863. The 3rd Minnesota would later be recalled to its home state in the Dakota War of 1862 where it took part in the victory at Wood Lake. The 9th Michigan and 7th Pennsylvania Cavalry would also soon be reorganized and fight at Stones River.
