= Stand Up, Stand Up for Jesus =

1858 Christian hymn

- by George Duffield Jr.
- Genre: Hymn
- Written: 1858
- Based on: Ephesians 6:14
- Meter: 7.6.7.6 D
- Melody: "Webb" by George James Webb, "Geibel" by Adam Geibel (lesser-used)

"Stand Up, Stand Up for Jesus" is an American Christian hymn. It was written by George Duffield Jr. in 1858 and is based on the dying words of Dudley Atkins Tyng. The traditional tune "Webb" was composed by George James Webb, based on the melody of Franz Schubert's "Die Forelle" ("The Trout"). A lesser-used tune "Geibel" was composed by Adam Geibel.

== History ==
In 1858, Presbyterian minister George Duffield Jr. was an associate of Dudley Atkins Tyng who had recently been removed from his local Episcopalian community for speaking against slavery. Duffield assisted Tyng in supporting a revival of evangelicalism in Pennsylvania. In March 1858, Tyng gave a sermon at a YMCA meeting of over 5,000 men on Exodus 10:11, "Go now ye that are men, and serve the Lord", converting over 1,000 men listening in the crowd. The following month, Tyng was maimed in a farming accident. Before he died a few days after the accident he told his father "Tell my brethren of the ministry, wherever you meet them, to stand up for Jesus." Duffield then wrote the hymn based on those words, and also incorporated the phrase "Ye that are men now serve Him" from Tyng's memorable sermon the month before he died. At a memorial service for Tyng, Duffield gave a sermon based on Ephesians 6:14, "Stand firm, wearing the whole armour of God", and ended it by reciting the new hymn he had written as a tribute. The hymn was first brought into public knowledge through leaflets printed by the superintendent of the local Christian school containing the words of the hymn. One of these leaflets ended up being published in a Baptist newspaper, and "Stand Up, Stand Up for Jesus" was published in The Church Psalmist in 1859.

After first publication, the hymn was popular and was sung by both the Union and Confederate soldiers in the American Civil War. The hymn also became popular among British revivalists, and within public schools in England. As a result of the images of Christian militarism in the hymn, some people object to the hymn, and some people do not stand to sing it. The hymn was excluded from a more politically correct volume of The Presbyterian Hymnal published in June 1990, in order not to offend handicapped people.

== Lyrics ==
Stand up! Stand up for Jesus!
Ye soldiers of the Cross;
Lift high his royal banner,
It must not suffer loss.
From vict'ry unto vict'ry
His army he shall lead,
Till ev'ry foe is vanquished
And Christ is Lord indeed.

Stand up! Stand up for Jesus!
The trumpet call obey,
Forth to the mighty conflict
In this his glorious day.
Ye that are men now serve him
Against unnumbered foes:
Let courage rise with danger,
And strength to strength oppose.

Stand up! Stand up for Jesus!
Stand in his strength alone;
The arm of flesh will fail you
Ye dare not trust your own
Put on the Gospel armour,
Each piece put on with pray'r;
Where duty calls or danger
Be never wanting there!

Stand up! Stand up for Jesus!
The strife will not be long;
This day the noise of battle,
The next the victor's song.
To him that overcometh
A crown of life shall be;
He with the King of Glory
Shall reign eternally

== Tune ==
Several melodies have been written for "Stand Up, Stand Up for Jesus". The one used most often now was written by George James Webb, who had originally composed it in 1837 for "Tis Dawn, the Lark is Singing", a song in a secular musical show performed on a ship travelling across the Atlantic Ocean.
