= 9th Michigan Infantry Regiment =

- Michigan State Flag.
- Active: October 15, 1861, to September 15, 1865
- Disbanded: September 15, 1865
- Country: United States
- Allegiance: Union
- Branch: Infantry
- Size: Regiment
- Garrison/HQ: Fort Wayne (Detroit) near Detroit, Michigan
- Engagements: American Civil War; Battle of Lebanon; First Battle of Murfreesboro; Battle of Stone's River; Battle of Chickamauga; Battle of Resaca; Battle of Kennesaw Mountain; Siege of Atlanta; Battle of Jonesboro

Commanders
- Notable commanders: Colonel William W. Duffield; Colonel John Gibson Parkhurst

The 9th Michigan Infantry Regiment was an infantry regiment that served in the Union Army during the American Civil War. The Ninth Michigan Infantry organized at Fort Wayne (Detroit), near Detroit, Michigan, from independent companies recruited throughout the state, and mustered into Federal service for a three-year enlistment on October 15, 1861. The regiment was under the command of William Ward Duffield as colonel and John G. Parkhurst as lieutenant colonel.

On the morning of July 13, 1862, the Union garrison was attacked by a force of 2,500 cavalry led by Confederate General Nathan Bedford Forrest in what was to be called the First Battle of Murfreesboro. After 8 hours of intense fighting, and suffering casualties of one-third of the fighting force, the 9th surrendered to Forrest. After being exchanged, the six captured companies rejoined the regiment in Bowling Green on November 3, 1862. The Court of Inquiry into the events at Murfreesboro praised the actions of the Ninth, and laid all the blame for the failures at Murfreesboro at the feet of Colonel Lester, whom it cashiered. Four other officers from the 3rd Minnesota were also court-martialed for cowardice at Murfreesboro. Second, General Thomas assigned the Ninth to be his headquarters guard. Men of the regiment believed that Gen. Thomas said that "he had a special duties for the regiment that had repulsed Forrest three times". Finally, Colonel Parkhurst returned to the regiment.

At the Battle of Stones River on December 26, 1862. When the Union right was crushed at Stone River, the Ninth did most gallant service in checking the stampede to the rear, by firmly holding the Nashville Pike, the disorganized forces were stopped and returned to their commands. Major General Thomas complimented Colonel Parkhurst and the regiment for the very important service rendered at this critical point of battle. The regiment was mustered out on September 15, 1865.

== Service ==
The Ninth Michigan Infantry organized at Fort Wayne (Detroit), near Detroit, Michigan, from independent companies recruited throughout the state, and mustered into Federal service for a three-year enlistment on October 15, 1861. The regiment was under the command of William Ward Duffield as colonel and John G. Parkhurst as lieutenant colonel. The Ninth was the first Michigan regiment ordered to the western army or the "Army of the Ohio", as it was called at the time. The regiment was sent to West Point, Kentucky, to build fortifications on Muldraugh's Hill.

March 9, the 23rd Brigade was created, consisting of the Ninth Michigan, the 3rd Minnesota, and the 8th and 23rd Kentucky regiments. Col. Duffield was placed in command of the brigade which was ordered to Nashville. This left Parkurst in command of the Ninth, which was ordered to Nashville. The regiment arrived in Nashville on March 23, and soon moved South to occupy the important city of Murfreesboro. Colonel Duffield left the brigade on May 9, to take command of the Department of Kentucky from the ailing Gen. Burnbridge. This left Col. Lester of the 3rd Minnesota in charge of the brigade. Monday, June 30, four companies (D, E, F and I) of the 9th Michigan, under the command of Major Fox, left Murfreesboro for Tullahoma. Col. Duffield rejoined the 9th in Murfreesboro on July 11, 1862.

=== Capture at Murfreesboro ===
At 4:00 a.m. on the morning of July 13, the Union garrison was attacked by a force of 2,500 cavalry led by Confederate General Nathan Bedford Forrest in what was to be called the First Battle of Murfreesboro. Because of decisions made by Col. Lester, the various Union forces were camped in different locations. The 9th were attacked furiously by Forrest's forces. At three different times during the fighting, the 9th sent messengers to Col. Lester and the 3rd Minnesota requesting reinforcements. Each time, the request was denied, even though the 3rd Minnesota were not under attack. After 8 hours of intense fighting, and suffering casualties of one-third of the fighting force, the 9th surrendered to Forrest. Col. Duffield was wounded twice during the battle and never returned to the regiment.

Forrest then invited Lester, under a flag of truce, to meet with the captured Union officers. Forrest lined the streets of town with as many Confederate soldiers as he could muster, giving the Union commander the impression that he was desperately outnumbered. After returning to his camp, Col. Lester and the 3rd Minnesota surrendered to Forrest, without having fired a shot.

The six captured companies of the Ninth were paroled, and made their way to Camp Chase, just outside Columbus Ohio. Eventually most of the regiment found their way home, waiting for word of their exchange so they could again take up arms.

=== Tullahoma Companies ===
The other four companies remained at Tullahoma for some time, continuing to fortify that location. A month later, August 29, 1862, Forrest attacked the Union garrison at McMinnville, Tennessee, which consisted of the 18th Ohio and Company D of the Ninth Infantry. Thirteen of Forrest's men were killed in the attack; however none the Union garrison's defenders were mortally wounded. The following month, September 11, 1862, the companies engaged Forrest at Tyree Springs, Tennessee. Its only casualty was Major Fox's son, Charles, who died twelve days later. The Ninth would endure only two other combat deaths during its existence. Both of them died in October 1864, from wounds suffered at Atlanta. Major Fox escorted his son's body home for burial, but did not return to the Ninth Regiment. He resigned on January 29, 1863, and was immediately commissioned colonel and charged with raising and organizing the Twenty-seventh Michigan Infantry.

=== Reconstitution at Bowling Green ===
After finally being exchanged, the six captured companies rejoined the regiment in Bowling Green on November 3, 1862. On Christmas Eve, three events happened which lifted the regiment's spirits tremendously. First a Court of Inquiry into the events at Murfreesboro praised the actions of the Ninth, and laid all the blame for the failures at Murfreesboro at the feet of Col. Lester, whom it cashiered. Four other officers from the 3rd Minnesota were also court-martialed for cowardice at Murfreesboro. Second, General Thomas assigned the Ninth to be his headquarters guard. Men of the regiment believed that Gen. Thomas said that "he had a special duties for the regiment that had repulsed Forrest three times". Finally, Colonel Parkhurst returned to the regiment.

The Court of Inquiry report was so favorable to Colonel Parkhurst that Gen Thomas appointed him provost marshal of the XIV Corp, and the ninth was made provost guards of General George Thomas' Fourteenth Corps, Army of the Cumberland as it was now called.

=== General Thomas' XIV Corps Headquarters Guard ===
At the Battle of Stones River on December 26, 1862. When the Union right was crushed at Stone River, the Ninth did most gallant service in checking the stampede to the rear, by firmly holding the Nashville Pike, the disorganized forces were stopped and returned to their commands. Major General Thomas complimented Colonel Parkhurst and the regiment for the very important service rendered at this critical point of battle.

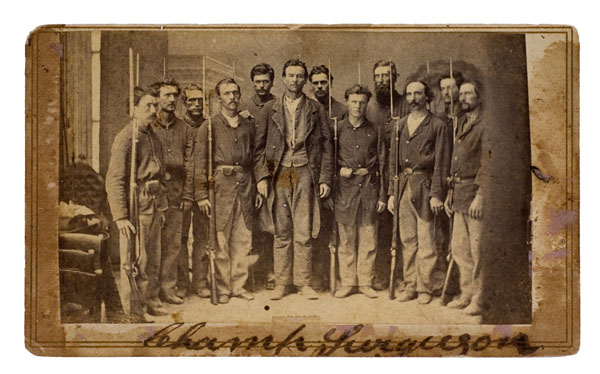
The Ninth Michigan Infantry guarded guerrilla Champ Ferguson in 1865

The regiment was mustered out on September 15, 1865.

== Total strength and casualties ==
Over its existence, the regiment carried a total of 2,074 men on its muster rolls.

The 9th Michigan lost 2 officers and 22 enlisted men killed in action or mortally wounded and 4 officers and 281 enlisted men who died of disease, for a total of 309 fatalities.

== Commanders ==
- Colonel William W. Duffield
- Colonel John Gibson Parkhurst

== See also ==
- List of Michigan Civil War Units
- Michigan in the American Civil War
