= William Ward Duffield =

American politician

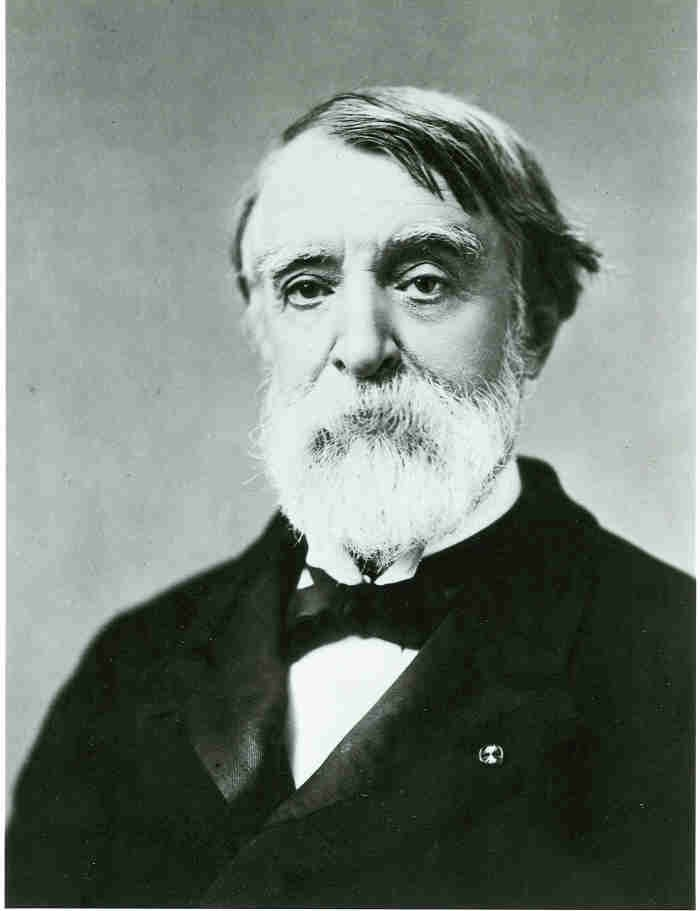

Superintendent of the United States Coast and Geodetic Survey
- In office 1894–1897
- Preceded by: Thomas Corwin Mendenhall
- Succeeded by: Henry Smith Pritchett

Personal details
- Born: November 19, 1823 Carlisle, Pennsylvania, US
- Died: June 22, 1907 (aged 83) Washington D.C., US
- Resting place: Arlington National Cemetery
- Education: Columbia University

William Ward Duffield (November 19, 1823 – June 22, 1907) was an executive in the coal industry, a railroad construction engineer, and an officer in the Union Army during the American Civil War. After the war he was appointed Superintendent of the United States Coast and Geodetic Survey.

== Early life ==
Duffield was born in Carlisle, Pennsylvania, the son of Isabella Graham (Bethune), and the Reverend George Duffield, a prominent minister in the Presbyterian Church. He was also the brother of Brigadier General Henry M. Duffield. Although he would call Michigan home after 1836, throughout his life William worked and traveled widely. He graduated in 1842 from Columbia College, New York City, as a civil engineer, and two years later received a Master of Arts. He later studied law and was admitted to the Detroit bar. At the onset of the Mexican–American War he entered the U.S. Army as adjutant of the 2nd Tennessee Infantry. Later during the war he served on the staff of General Gideon J. Pillow. He went to California as an Army paymaster after the war and qualified as a founding member in the Society of California Pioneers. During this service he became well enough versed in the military sciences to author two books on the subject. After leaving the Army he worked as engineer and superintendent of railroads in New York; surveyed the Detroit and Milwaukee Railroad from Pontiac to Grand Haven, from Detroit to Port Huron, and from Mendota to Galesburg, Illinois.

== Civil War ==
When the Civil War erupted, Duffield joined the 4th Michigan Infantry as its lieutenant colonel, and participated with the regiment in the First Battle of Bull Run. In September 1861 he resigned from the 4th and accepted a commission as colonel of the 9th Michigan Infantry.

On January 9, 1862, he was ordered to Bardstown, Kentucky, to head an officer examining board. From March 8 to May 14, 1862, he commanded the 23rd Brigade of the Army of the Ohio. On April 11, 1862, he was appointed acting brigadier general, but his appointment was not confirmed by the United States Senate; it was tabled on July 16, 1862. On May 9, 1862, he was appointed acting military governor of Kentucky. On July 12, 1862, Duffield arrived in Murfreesboro, Tennessee, in command of the 9th Michigan. The following day the Union garrison, under the overall command of Brig. Gen. Thomas T. Crittenden, was attacked and defeated by Confederate General Nathan Bedford Forrest in the First Battle of Murfreesboro. Col. Duffield received two gunshot wounds during the attack; one passing through the right testicle, the other through the left thigh. These, although very painful and bleeding profusely, did not prevent him from remaining with his own regiment until the attack was repulsed, when, fainting from pain and loss of blood. He was carried from the field. At noon the same day he was made prisoner by General Forrest, but, in his then helpless condition, was released upon his parole promising not to bear arms against the Confederate States until being regularly exchanged. He was exchanged on August 27, 1862.

== Postbellum career ==
Duffield resigned from the Army on February 6, 1863, and returned to Michigan. After the war he had charge of coal mines in Pennsylvania and iron mines in Kentucky, and was chief engineer of the Kentucky Union Railroad. In 1879–1880 he served as a member of the Michigan State Senate. He was appointed by President Grover Cleveland as Superintendent of the United States Coast and Geodetic Survey, holding that position from 1894 to 1897. He spent his last years in Washington, D.C., where he died. He is buried in Arlington National Cemetery in Arlington, Virginia.

== Notes ==
Government offices
Preceded by Thomas Corwin Mendenhall	Superintendent, United States Coast and Geodetic Survey; 1894–1897	Succeeded by Henry Smith Pritchett
