= Christopher Columbus Andrews =

American politician

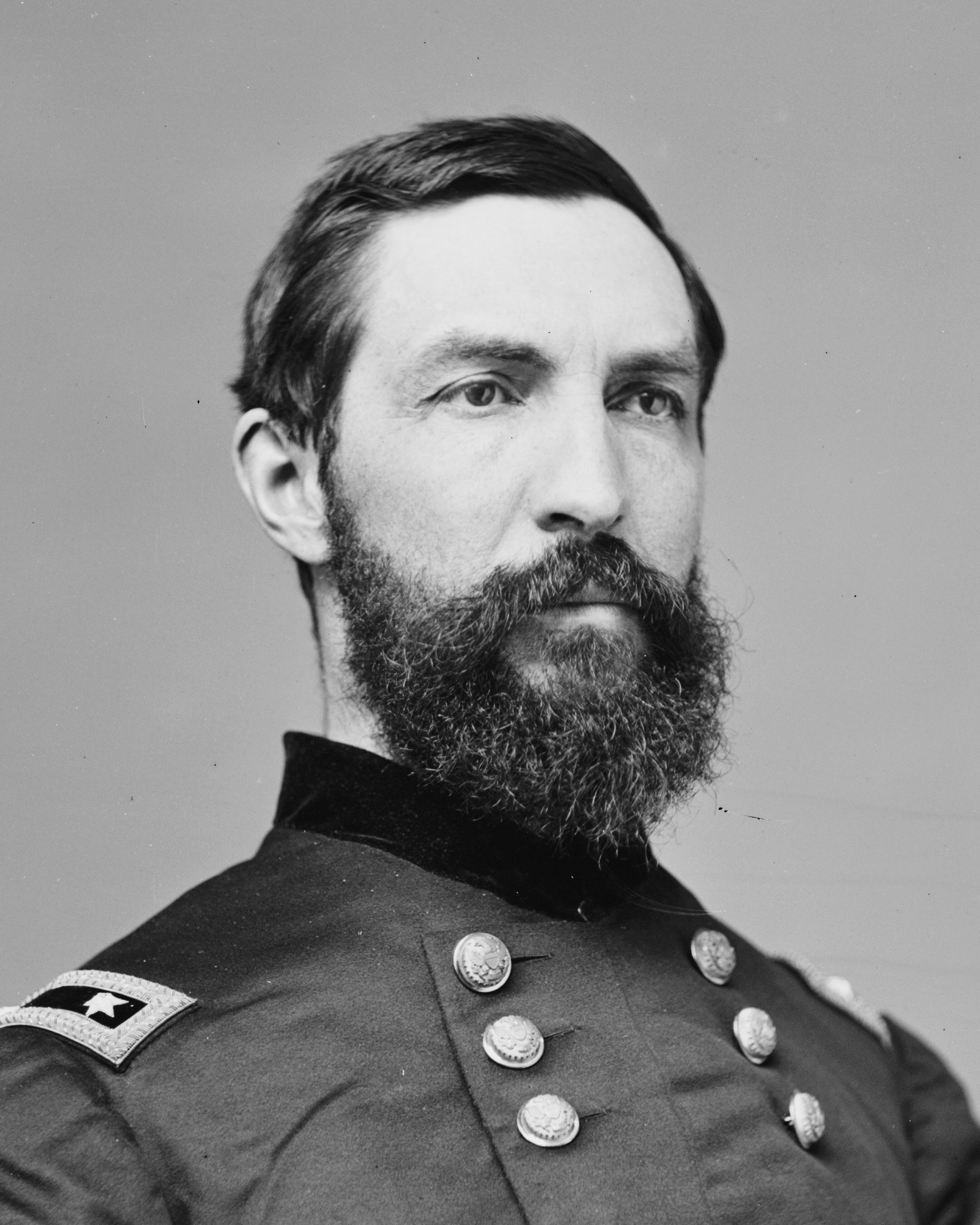
- Andrews c. 1861-1865
- Born: October 27, 1829; Hillsborough, New Hampshire, U.S.
- Died: September 21, 1922 (aged 92); Saint Paul, Minnesota, U.S.
- Burial place: Oakland Cemetery; Saint Paul, Minnesota
- Military career
- Allegiance: United States of America; Union
- Branch: United States Army; Union Army
- Service years: 1861–1866
- Rank: Brigadier General; Brevet Major General
- Commands: 3rd Minnesota Volunteer Infantry Regiment
- Conflicts: American Civil War; Vicksburg Campaign; Battle of Fort Blakeley
- Other work: Ambassador to Sweden and Norway

Christopher Columbus Andrews (October 27, 1829 – September 21, 1922) was an American soldier, diplomat, newspaperman, author, and forester.

== Early life and career ==
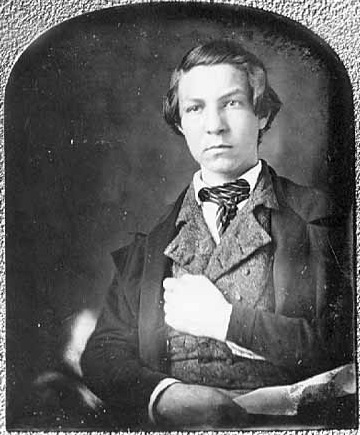
Christopher Columbus Andrews, approximately age 14, ca. 1843

Andrews was born in Hillsborough, New Hampshire, the son of a rural farmer. He attended school during the winter months until 1843, when he traveled to Boston. He attended the Francestown Academy, completed his education, and studied law in Cambridge, Massachusetts in 1848. He passed his bar examination two years later and established a law practice in Newton, Massachusetts, where he served as a member of the city school board in 1851–1852.

He briefly relocated to Boston in 1853, but left the following year for the West, settling in Kansas. He went to Washington, D.C. to help promote Kansas's interest to the United States Congress, and spent two years working as a law clerk in the United States Treasury Department. He then moved to St. Cloud, Minnesota, in 1856, and three years later, was elected to the Minnesota State Senate. During the presidential election of 1860, he actively supported the Northern Democrat Stephen A. Douglas and was nominated as a presidential elector. Despite his support for Douglas, in 1861, he was instrumental in establishing a newspaper, the Minnesota Union, supporting the policies of President Abraham Lincoln, and served as an editor before enlisting in the Union Army.

== Civil War ==
During the Civil War, Andrews rose to the rank of brigadier general and at its close was brevetted as a major general. He originally enlisted as a private, but was commissioned captain in the 3rd Minnesota Infantry. Captured by Confederates in Tennessee in July 1862, he was held as a prisoner of war until October, when he was exchanged. He returned to his regiment as lieutenant colonel and participated in the Vicksburg Campaign.

In July 1863, Andrews was promoted to colonel and commanded a brigade in the operations to capture Little Rock, Arkansas, later in the year. Throughout the balance of the year and into early 1864, Andrews helped organize and foster the Unionists in Arkansas and was influential in the reorganization of Arkansas as a free state. He was promoted to brigadier general in acknowledgment of his efforts while commanding troops near Augusta, Arkansas. Andrews was assigned to the command of the Second Division of the XIII Corps, and participated in the siege and storming of Fort Blakeley in Alabama. On March 9, 1865, he was brevetted Major General and assigned command of the district of Mobile.

== Postbellum ==
Andrews was dispatched to Houston, Texas, to supervise the early stages of Reconstruction in the region and to keep the order while a new provisional civil government was put in place under Governor Andrew J. Hamilton. He mustered out of the service on January 15, 1866. He was a companion of the Minnesota Commandery of the Military Order of the Loyal Legion of the United States - a military society of officers who had served in the Union armed forces during the American Civil War.

Andrews was appointed by President Grant as United States Minister to Denmark on April 16, 1869, and was sworn into office but never proceeded to his post. He was then appointed as United States Minister to Sweden and Norway and served from 1869 to 1877. He served as United States Consul-General to the Empire of Brazil from 1882 to 1885. He helped supervise the 1880 census for Minnesota.

After the war, Andrews, interested in scientific forestry, worked to stir public sentiment for responsible logging and forest practices, but without much success until the Great Hinckley Fire of 1894 burned several towns in east-central Minnesota, garnering widespread public attention. He maintained that proper forestry would renew the state's ravaged timberlands and make them fire-resistant. Eventually, leading foresters and companies began to implement Andrews' ideas and practices. He was Minnesota state Forestry Commissioner when the Baudette Fire of 1910 burned, further strengthening his argument for regulation of forestry.

A prolific writer, his publications include a History of the Campaign of Mobile (1867) and Brazil, Its Conditions and Prospects (1887; third edition, 1895).

== Personal life ==
Andrews married Mary Baxter in December 1868.

== See also ==
- List of American Civil War generals (Union)
- General C. C. Andrews State Forest, Pine County, Minnesota
