= Nettie Moore =

Nettie Moore may refer to:

- "Nettie Moore" (song), a song on Bob Dylan's Modern Times album
- Nettie Moore (singer), a singer in the U.S. who recorded on Black Swan Records

== See also ==
- "Gentle Nettie Moore", an American song by Marshall S. Pike and J. S. Pierpont (credited with inspiring Dylan's song)
