= Jacob B. Sweitzer =

American lawyer

Jacob Bowman Sweitzer
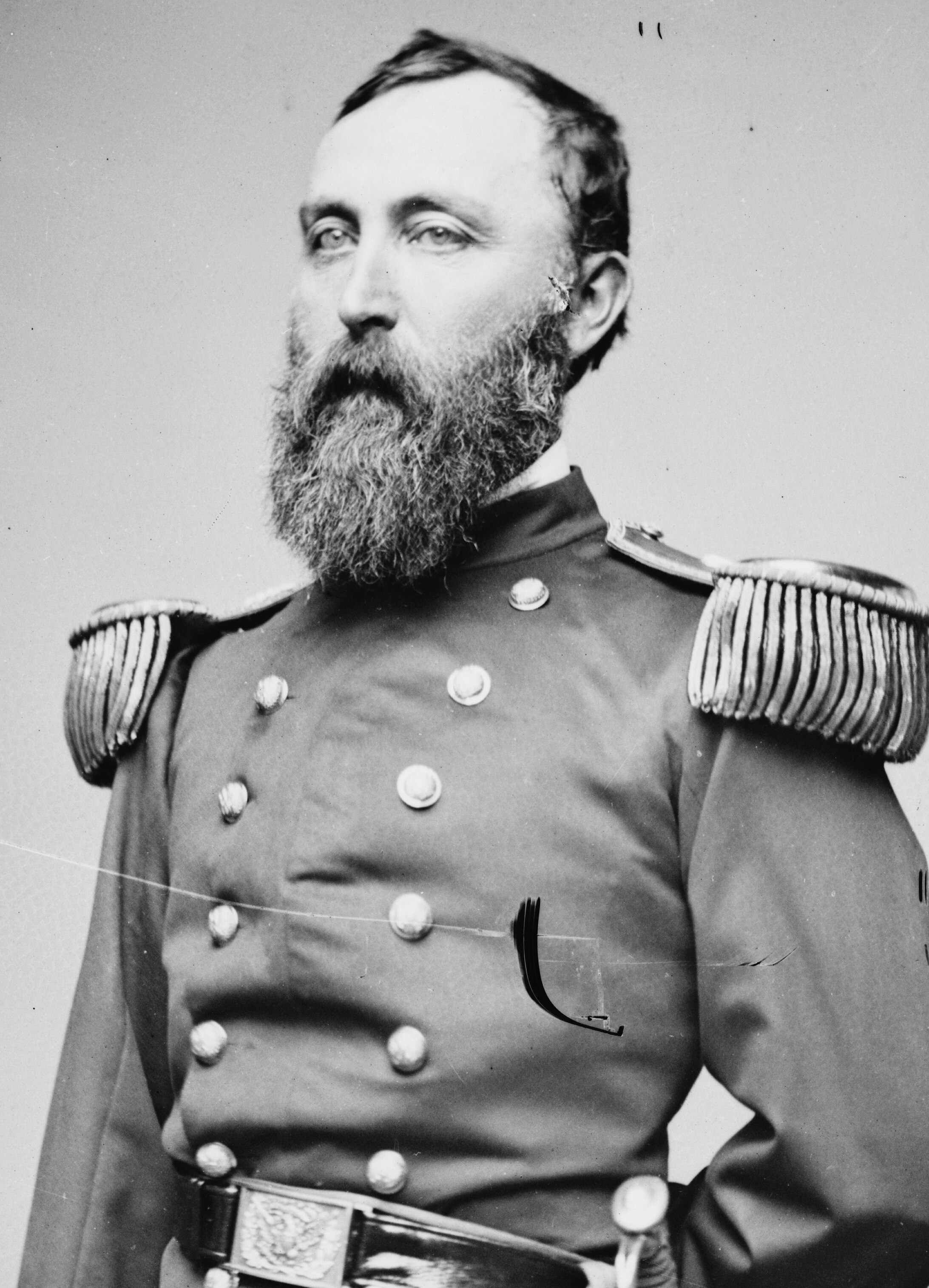
- Born: July 4, 1821; Brownsville, Pennsylvania
- Died: November 9, 1888 (aged 67); Allegheny, Pennsylvania
- Burial place: Allegheny Cemetery, Pittsburgh, Pennsylvania
- Military career
- Allegiance: United States of America; Union
- Branch: United States Army; Union Army
- Service years: 1861–1864
- Rank: Colonel; Brevet Brigadier General
- Commands: 62nd Pennsylvania Infantry; Sweitzer's Brigade, V Corps
- Conflicts: American Civil War: Peninsula Campaign; Second Battle of Bull Run; Battle of Antietam; Battle of Fredericksburg; Battle of Gettysburg; Mine Run Campaign; Overland Campaign; Siege of Petersburg
- Other work: Attorney

Jacob Bowman Sweitzer (July 4, 1821 – November 9, 1888) was a Pennsylvania lawyer and soldier who commanded a regiment and then a brigade in the Army of the Potomac in the American Civil War. He and his men were significantly engaged at the 1863 Battle of Gettysburg, where they reinforced and helped temporarily stabilize the Union defensive line on the second day of fighting.

== Early life ==
Jacob Bowman Sweitzer was born July 4, 1821, in Brownsville, Pennsylvania. He was the son of Henry Sweitzer (1780-1852) and Ann Elliott Bowman (1790-1876). His Paternal ancestors were George Ludwig "Lewis" Sweitzer (1740-1795) and Conrad Sweitzer/Schweitzer (1706-1770), who arrived in Philadelphia in 1749 from Germany. His brother, Nelson Bowman Sweitzer, who became a career army officer, was born in Brownsville seven years later. Jacob Sweitzer studied at Jefferson College, graduating in 1843.

He later studied law, passed the bar exam, and established a legal practice in Pittsburgh. In 1849, he was nominated as U.S. Attorney for the Western District of Pennsylvania by President Zachary Taylor to succeed John L. Dawson. Confirmed in 1850, he served until May 9, 1853.

== Civil War ==
Sweitzer was named major of the 62nd Pennsylvania Infantry on July 4, 1861. He became lieutenant colonel on November 17 of that year and colonel on June 27, 1862. Sweitzer served in the Seven Days Battles, being wounded and captured at the Battle of Gaines' Mill. After being exchanged on August 15, 1862, he led his regiment in the First Division, V Corps at the Second Battle of Bull Run and at Antietam in the brigade of Brig. Gen. Charles Griffin.

When Griffin became commander of the First Division, Sweitzer was temporarily his successor in brigade command, including at the Battle of Fredericksburg. Subsequently, Sweitzer returned to his regimental role. He resumed command of the brigade at the Battle of Chancellorsville, succeeding Col. James McQuade. (McQuade was senior to Sweitzer, but he had missed Fredericksburg.)

=== Gettysburg ===
At the Battle of Gettysburg, the V Corps arrived early on July 2, 1863, after a hard march from Unionville, Maryland. The First Division, temporarily led by Brig. Gen. James Barnes, was sent to the left flank to aid III Corps. Sweitzer’s brigade and that of Col. William S. Tilton went into action between the Wheatfield and the Peach Orchard. (The Third Brigade, under Col. Strong Vincent, was detached and sent to Little Round Top.) The two brigades were deployed at a perpendicular angle to one another, making their position difficult to maintain under attack. After enduring Confederate assaults, General Barnes decided to withdraw from an exposed position. Sweitzer’s report describes the order to withdraw as "peremptory".

Sweitzer’s command, however, was sent back into the fight, entering the Wheatfield. It was flanked, however, by Confederate Brig. Gen. William T. Wofford's brigade, suffering serious losses. Col. Harrison Jeffords of the 4th Michigan Infantry Regiment was killed when Confederate soldiers tried to capture his regiment’s flag. The brigade withdrew toward Little Round Top and was positioned in that vicinity for the remainder of the battle. It later participated in the retreat of the Confederate army. Sweitzer had only three regiments present (the 9th Massachusetts Infantry Regiment was on detached duty). He reported that his regiments lost 466 out of 1,010 present on the field.

Sweitzer retained his brigade in the autumn of 1863, participating in the earlier stages of the Bristoe campaign and in the Mine Run campaign.

=== After Gettysburg ===
When the Army of the Potomac was reorganized preceding Lt. Gen. Ulysses S. Grant's Overland Campaign, Sweitzer retained brigade command in Griffin’s First Division. His brigade absorbed Tilton’s 22nd Regiment Massachusetts Volunteer Infantry. Sweitzer led the brigade at the Battle of the Wilderness and the Battle of Spotsylvania. Sweitzer distinguished himself at the Battle of North Anna, holding the exposed right flank of V Corps during a Confederate attack near Jericho Mills. He also commanded these troops at the Battle of Cold Harbor and the early stages of the siege of Petersburg.

Sweitzer was mustered out with his regiment on July 13, 1864. He received a brevet promotion to the rank of brigadier general for "war service" on March 13, 1865.

== Postbellum activities ==
After leaving the army, Sweitzer settled in Pittsburgh and resumed his legal practice there. Sweitzer died at his home in Allegheny City on November 9, 1888, and was buried at Allegheny Cemetery.

== Family ==
His younger brother Nelson Bowman Sweitzer (December 12, 1828 – March 7, 1898) was an 1853 West Point graduate and career cavalry officer who was also brevetted brigadier general for his Civil War service as colonel of the 16th New York Cavalry Regiment.
