= James Lord Pierpont =

American songwriter and composer (1822–1893)

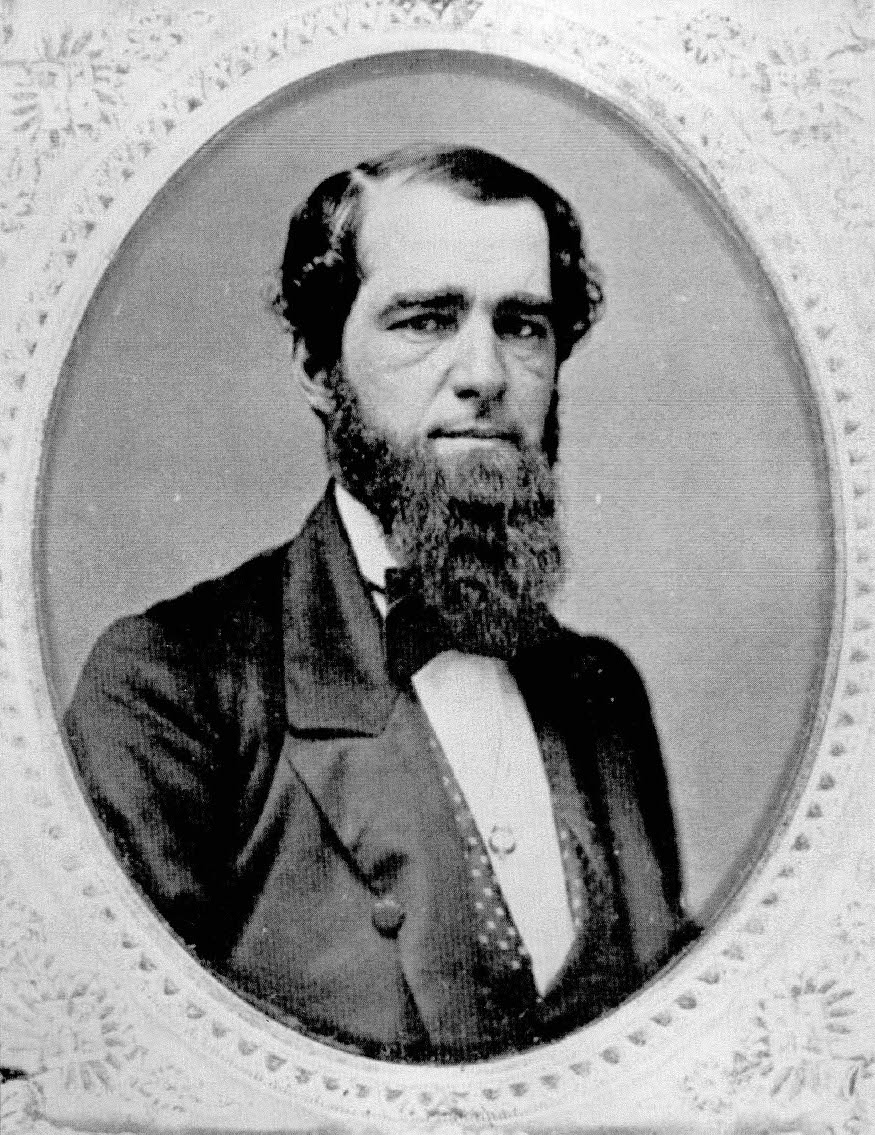

Background information
- Born: April 25, 1822; Boston, Massachusetts, US
- Died: August 5, 1893 (aged 71) Winter Haven, Florida, US
- Occupations: Composer, songwriter, arranger, organist
- Spouses: Millicent Cowee (1846–1856); Eliza Jane Purse
- Military Service
- Allegiance: Confederate States of America
- Branch: Confederate Army
- Service years: 1861–1865
- Rank: Private
- Units: Lamar Rangers; 1st Georgia Cavalry Battalion; 5th Georgia Cavalry Regiment
- Conflicts: American Civil War: Defence of the Georgia coast; Atlanta Campaign; Carolinas Campaign

James Lord Pierpont (April 25, 1822 – August 5, 1893) was an American composer, songwriter, arranger, organist, and Confederate soldier. Pierpont wrote and composed "Jingle Bells" in 1857, originally titled "The One Horse Open Sleigh".

Pierpont was born in Boston, Massachusetts, and died in Winter Haven, Florida. Although Pierpont is obscure today, his composition "Jingle Bells" has become synonymous with the Christmas holiday and is one of the most performed and most recognizable songs in the world.

== Early life ==
James Lord Pierpont was born on April 25, 1822, in Boston, Massachusetts. His father, the Reverend John Pierpont (1785–1866), was a pastor of the Unitarian Hollis Street Church in Boston, an abolitionist and a poet. Robert Fulghum confused James with his father in the book It Was On Fire When I Lay Down On It (1989); erroneously attributing the authorship of "Jingle Bells" to the Rev. John Pierpont. James' mother was Mary Sheldon Lord (1787–1855), the daughter of Lynde Lord Jr. (1762–1813), and Mary Lyman. James was the uncle of the financier and banker John Pierpont Morgan. John and Mary Pierpont had six children.

In 1832, James was sent to a boarding school in New Hampshire at the age of 10. Four years later, James ran away to sea aboard a whaling ship called the Shark. He then served in the U.S. Navy until the age of 21.

By 1845, he returned to the Northeast visiting New England and moving to New York where his father was the pastor of a Unitarian congregation in Troy, New York. Pierpont married Millicent Cowee, the daughter of Farwell Cowee and Abigail Merriam, in 1846, and they settled in Troy, where they had two children. His father, Rev. John Pierpont, assumed a position as minister of a Unitarian congregation in Medford, Massachusetts, in 1849.

In 1849, James Pierpont left his wife and children with his father in Massachusetts to open a business in San Francisco during the California Gold Rush. He also worked as a photographer. His business failed after his goods burned in a fire.

In 1856, Millicent died, and after James' brother, the Rev. John Pierpont Jr. (1819–1879), accepted a post with the Savannah, Georgia, Unitarian congregation, James followed, taking a post as the organist and music director of the church. To support himself, he also gave organ and singing lessons. The organ is presently in the possession of Florida State University.

== Career ==
On March 27, 1852, Pierpont published his composition "The Returned Californian", based on his experiences in San Francisco, published in Boston by E. H. Wade of 197 Washington Street. "The Returned Californian" was originally sung by S. C. Howard, of Ordway's Aeolians, and was written expressly for Ordway's Aeolians "by James Pierpont Esq." and was arranged by John Pond Ordway (1824–1880). The song narrates a version of Pierpont's experiences during the California Gold Rush and the failure of his San Francisco business. The U.S. Library of Congress possesses a copy of the original sheet music for the song. The lyrics to "The Returned Californian" are as follows:

Oh, I'm going far away from my Creditors just now,
I ain't the tin to pay 'em and they're kicking up a row;
I ain't one of those lucky ones that works for 'Uncle Sam,'
There's no chance for speculation and the mines ain't worth a ('d--') Copper.

There's my tailor vowing vengeance and he swears he'll give me Fitts,
And Sheriff's running after me with pockets full of writs;
And which ever way I turn, I am sure to meet a dun,
So I guess the best thing I can do, is just to cut and run.

Oh! I wish those 'tarnel critters that wrote home about the gold
Were in the place the Scriptures say 'is never very cold;'
For they told about the heaps of dust and lumps so mighty big,
But they never said a single word how hard they were to dig.

So I went up to the mines and I helped to turn a stream,
And got trusted on the strength of that delusive golden dream;
But when we got to digging we found 'twas all a sham,
And we who dam'd the rivers by our creditors were damn'd.

Oh! I'm going far away but I don't know where I'll go,
I oughter travel homeward but they'll laugh at me I know;
For I told 'em when I started I was bound to make a pile,
But if they could only see mine now I rather guess they'd smile.

If of these United States I was the President,
No man that owed another should ever pay a cent;
And he who dunn'd another should be banished far away,
And attention to the pretty girls is all a man should pay.

In 1853, Pierpont had published new minstrel compositions in Boston, among them "Kitty Crow", dedicated to W. W. McKim, and "The Colored Coquette", a minstrel song published by Oliver Ditson. "The Coquette" and an arrangement for guitar entitled "The Coquet" were also published that year. Pierpont also published an arrangement entitled "The Universal Medley".

In 1854, Pierpont composed the songs "Geraldine" and "Ring the Bell, Fanny" for George Kunkle's Nightingale Opera Troupe. He also copyrighted the song "To the Loved Ones at Home" in 1854 and "Poor Elsie", a ballad, written and arranged expressly for Campbell's Minstrels, who were rivals to Christy's Minstrels. In 1855, he composed "The Starlight Serenade", published by Miller and Beacham in Baltimore. Pierpont also composed "I Mourn For My Old Cottage Home". In 1857, Pierpont had another successful hit song composition with a song written in collaboration with lyricist Marshall S. Pike, "The Little White Cottage" or "Gentle Nettie Moore", published by Oliver Ditson and Company, and copyrighted on September 16, 1857. The songwriting credit appeared as: "Poetry by Marshall S. Pike, Esq.", the "Melody by G. S. P.", and "Chorus and Piano Accompaniment by J. S. [sic] Pierpont". (Note: Pierpont's name appeared incorrectly as "J. S. Pierpont" on the sheet music cover for "The Little White Cottage". See: "The Little White Cottage, or Gentle Nettie Moore". Library of Congress. Retrieved: December 15, 2020)

Pierpont published several ballads, polkas, such as "The Know Nothing Polka", published by E. H. Wade in 1854, and minstrel songs. (Note: While "Jingle Bells' remains his only song that is regularly performed and recorded, his other songs are known and have been recorded and performed as well. Jamie Keena, for example, a balladeer and authority on 19th century music has recorded several Pierpont compositions from this period, including "Ring the Bell, Fanny" (1854), "Quitman Town March", and "Wait, Lady, Wait", as well as three Confederacy songs written in the 1860s, "Our Battle Flag", "We Conquer or Die" (1861), and "Strike for the South" (1863). See: "James Lord Pierpont. The Hymns and Carols of Christmas" Retrieved: December 15, 2020)

In August 1857, Pierpont married Eliza Jane Purse, the daughter of Savannah's 36th mayor in 1861-62, Thomas Purse of the Democratic (Southern) Party. She soon gave birth to the first of their children, Lillie. Pierpont's children by his first marriage remained in Massachusetts with their grandfather.

== "Jingle Bells" ==
In August 1857, his song "The One Horse Open Sleigh" was published by Oliver Ditson and Company of 277 Washington Street in Boston dedicated to John P. Ordway. The song was copyrighted on September 16, 1857. It is an unsettled question where and when Pierpont originally composed the song that would become known as "Jingle Bells". Researcher Kyna Hamill found a playbill showing that the first attested performance of "One Horse Open Sleigh" took place on Sept. 15, 1857, at Ordway Hall, a prominent minstrel theater in Boston. Hamil proposes that the song was composed in Boston, before Pierpont moved to Savannah in the fall of 1857. It has been previously claimed that the song was originally performed in a Sunday school concert on Thanksgiving in Savannah, Georgia. It has also been claimed that Pierpont wrote it in Medford, Massachusetts, in 1850. In 1859, it was re-published with the new title "Jingle Bells, or The One Horse Open Sleigh" with different graphics on the cover. A drawing of a horse collar with 21 bells and the title covered in snow now appeared on the sheet music cover. The song was not a hit as Pierpont had originally published it.

The original lyrics to "The One Horse Open Sleigh" as written by James Lord Pierpont in 1857 are as follows:

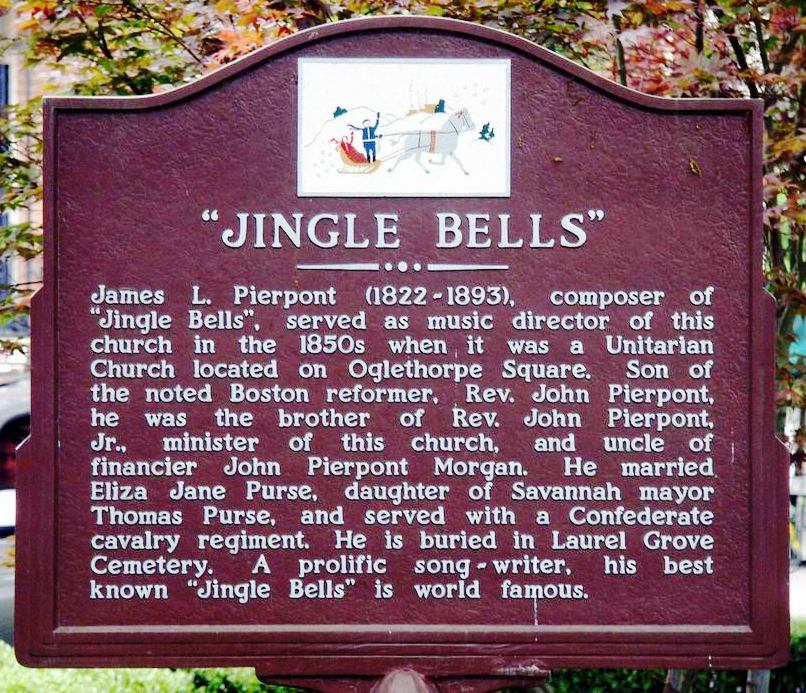
The commemorative plaque for James Lord Pierpont and his "Jingle Bells" in Savannah, Georgia, US

Jingle Bells, Or The One Horse Open Sleigh
Original melody

Jingle Bells
Performed on Piano, flute, clarinet, French horn

Jingle Bells
Performed on Celesta and Violin

Dashing thro' the snow,
In a one-horse open sleigh,
O'er the hills we go,
Laughing all the way;
Bells on bob tail ring,
Making spirits bright,
Oh what sport to ride and sing
A sleighing song to night.

Jingle bells, Jingle bells,
Jingle all the way;
Oh! what joy it is to ride
In a one horse open sleigh.
Jingle bells, Jingle bells,
Jingle all the way;
Oh! what joy it is to ride
In a one horse open sleigh.

A day or two ago,
I thought I'd take a ride,
And soon Miss Fannie Bright
Was seated by my side,
The horse was lean and lank;
Misfortune seemed his lot,
He got into a drifted bank,
And we, we got upsot.

A day or two ago,
The story I must tell
I went out on the snow
And on my back I fell;
A gent was riding by
In a one-horse open sleigh,
He laughed as there I sprawling lie,
But quickly drove away.

Now the ground is white
Go it while you're young,
Take the girls to night
And sing this sleighing song;
Just get a bob tailed bay
Two forty as his speed.
Hitch him to an open sleigh
And crack, you'll take the lead.

Later arrangements of the song made minor alterations to the lyrics and introduced a new, simpler melody for the chorus. In this modified form, "Jingle Bells" became one of the most popular and most recognizable songs ever written.

== Civil War ==
At the beginning of the Civil War, in the summer of 1861, Pierpont enlisted as a private in the Lamar Rangers, a militia cavalry regiment from Lamar County, Georgia. In September 1861 the Lamar Rangers became a Company of the 1st Georgia Cavalry Battalion and on September 1, Pierpont joined the regiment as a private.

The 1st Georgia Battalion served on the Georgia coast from 1861 to 1863, guarding against Union attacks but not seeing much action. On January 20, 1863, the 1st Georgia Cavalry Battalion was merged to become the 5th Georgia Cavalry Regiment, and Pierpont mustered into Company H. He served with the 5th Cavalry until April 1865, and fought at many battles in the Atlanta campaign and the Carolinas campaign. Records indicate that he served some time as a company clerk.

He also wrote music for the Confederacy, including "Our Battle Flag", "Strike for the South" and "We Conquer or Die". His father saw military service in 1861 as a chaplain with the 22nd Massachusetts Infantry of the Union Army stationed in Washington, D.C., and later worked for the U.S. Treasury Department. Pierpont and his father were thus on opposite sides during the Civil War.

== Later life ==
After the war, Pierpont moved his family to Valdosta, Georgia, where he taught music. According to Savannah author Margaret DeBolt and researcher Milton J. Rahn, Pierpont's son, Maynard Boardman, was born in Valdosta. The 1870 Lowndes County Census listed: "Pierpont, James 48, Eliza J. 38, Lillie 16, Thomas 8, Josiah 5, and Maynard B. 4." If Lillie was 16 in 1870, she was born in about 1854.

Pierpont’s first wife died in 1856, and a previously referenced census cited Eliza’s marriage and Lillie’s birth as 1857. Pierpont’s first wife undoubtedly died in 1856, so if Lillie, his child by his second wife, was born in 1854, it would have been more than two years before his first wife died. In the late 1800s, Lillie Pierpont was made a Special Agent of Indian Affairs, thanks to a letter she wrote to Frances Cleveland, imploring her to bring to her husband's attention the plight of the Seminole who yet remained in Florida.

In 1869, Pierpont moved to Quitman, Georgia. There he was the organist in the Presbyterian Church, gave private piano lessons and taught at the Quitman Academy, retiring as the head of the Musical Department.

In 1880, Pierpont's son, Dr. Juriah Pierpont, M.D., renewed the copyright on "Jingle Bells" but he never made much money from it. It took considerable effort to keep his father's name permanently attached to the song after the copyright expired.

Pierpont spent his final days at his son's home in Winter Haven, Florida, where he died on August 5, 1893. At his request, he was buried in Laurel Grove Cemetery in Savannah beside his brother-in-law Thomas Purse, who had been killed in the First Battle of Bull Run as a private in Company B, 8th Georgia Infantry.

== Other compositions ==
James Pierpont's other compositions include:

- "The Returned Californian", 1852
- "Kitty Crow", Ballad, 1853
- "The Coquette, A Comic Song", 1853, with "Words by Miss C. B.". "The Coquet" was an arrangement for guitar by Pierpont of "The Coquette"
- "The Colored Coquette", a minstrel song, 1853
- "To the Loved Ones at Home", 1854
- "Ring the Bell, Fanny", 1854
- "Geraldine", 1854
- "Poor Elsie", Ballad, 1854
- "The Know Nothing Polka", 1854
- "The Starlight Serenade", 1855
- "To All I Love, 'Good Night'"
- "I Mourn For My Old Cottage Home"
- "Gentle Nettie Moore" or as "The Little White Cottage", 1857, Marshall S. Pike, lyrics, "Melody by G. S. P.", "Chorus and Piano Accompaniment by J. S. [sic] Pierpont"
- "Wait, Lady, Wait"
- "Quitman Town March"
- "Our Battle Flag"
- "We Conquer or Die", 1861
- "Strike for the South", 1863
- "Oh! Let Me Not Neglected Die!"

Bob Dylan based his song "Nettie Moore" on the Modern Times (2006) album on "Gentle Nettie Moore". The structure of the chorus and the first two lines ("Oh, I miss you Nettie Moore / And my happiness is o'er") of Bob Dylan's "Nettie Moore" are the same as those of "The Little White Cottage, or Gentle Nettie Moore", the ballad published in 1857 in Boston, by Marshall S. Pike (poetry), G.S.P. (melody) and James S. Pierpont (chorus and piano accompaniment). The 1857 song is about a man pining for a girl, Nettie Moore, bought into servitude by a Louisiana trader, who "gave to Master money", shackled her with chains, and took her away from the little white cottage "to work her life away".

The Sons of the Pioneers with Roy Rogers recorded "Gentle Nettie Moore" in August 1934 for Standard Radio in Los Angeles and released it as a 33 RPM radio disc, EE Master 1720. The recording was reissued on the CD no. 4 of the 5 CD set Songs Of The Prairies: The Standard Transcriptions – Part 1: 1934-1935 on Bear Family Records, BCD 15710 EI, 1998, Germany. The songwriting credit on this collection is listed as: "Gentle Nettie Moore" (Marshall S. Pike/James Pierpont). The song also appears on the 1982 collection The Sons Of The Pioneers: Songs Of The Hills and Plains on American Folk Music Archive and Research Center. Judy Martin and Her Mountain Rangers also recorded the song which appears on the album Vol. 2. Also featuring Red Foley on B.A.C.M. in 2008.

== Honors ==
- From 1890 to 1954, Pierpont's "Jingle Bells" was in the top 25 of the most frequently recorded songs in history, ahead of "My Old Kentucky Home", "The Stars and Stripes Forever", "Blue Skies", "I Got Rhythm" and "Georgia on My Mind".
- In recognition of the universal success of his composition, Pierpont was elected into the Songwriters Hall of Fame in 1970.
- In 1997, a James Lord Pierpont Music Scholarship Fund was established at Armstrong Atlantic State University in Savannah, Georgia.
