= Jesse Gove =

Jesse Augustus Gove
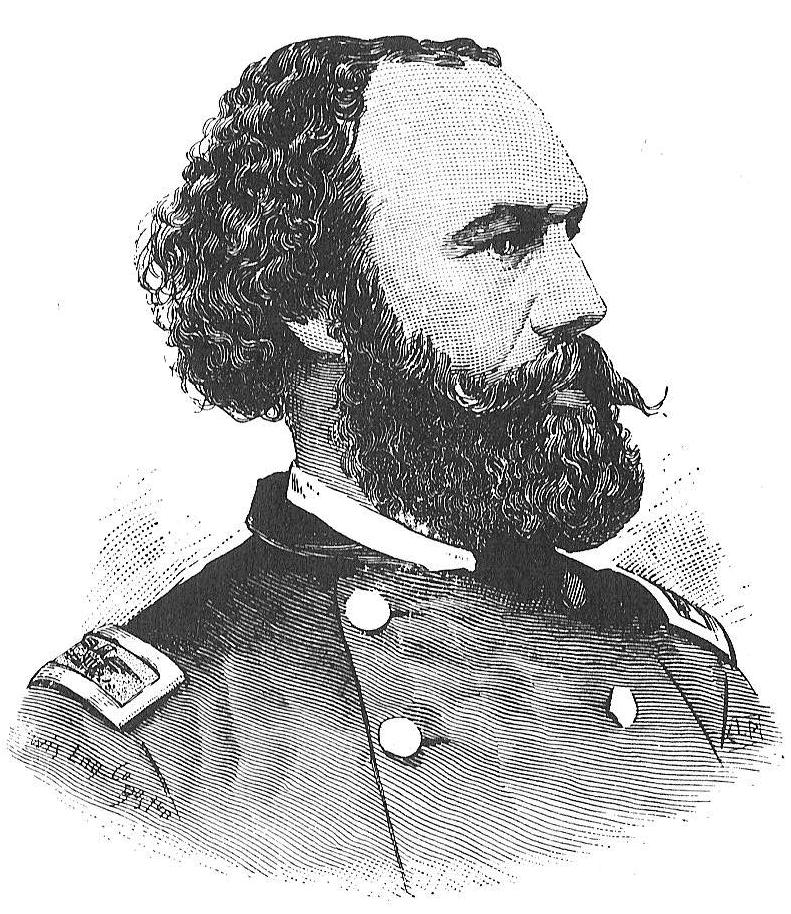
- Born: December 5, 1824; Weare, New Hampshire, US
- Died: June 27, 1862 (aged 37); Gaines' Mill, Hanover County, Virginia, US
- Military career
- Allegiance: United States
- Branch: Union Army
- Service years: 1847–1848; 1855–1862
- Rank: Colonel
- Commands: 22nd Regiment Massachusetts Volunteer Infantry
- Conflicts: Mexican–American War; Utah War; American Civil War

Jesse Augustus Gove (December 5, 1824 – June 27, 1862) was an American soldier and lawyer, noteworthy for his military career and his role as a colonel in the American Civil War. After graduating from the American Literary Scientific and Military Academy at Norwich, Vermont, Gove served in the Mexican–American War. After the war, he left the army and became a lawyer in New Hampshire, then returned to army service in 1855. During the Civil War he was colonel of the 22nd Massachusetts Volunteer Infantry and was killed leading that regiment in the Battle of Gaines' Mill.

== Early career ==
Gove was born in Weare, New Hampshire, and, electing to pursue a career in the army, he was educated at Norwich Military Academy. In 1847, he was appointed second lieutenant in the 9th United States Infantry. He served in the Mexican–American War during which he was promoted to first lieutenant.

At the close of the war, the 9th U.S. Infantry was disbanded. Gove took up the study of law at the Concord, New Hampshire law offices of Pierce & Minot, of which Franklin Pierce (soon to become President of the United States) was the senior partner. Gove was admitted to the bar in 1851. From 1850 to 1855, he was Deputy Secretary of State for New Hampshire.

In 1855, he returned to the regular army and was commissioned captain of Company I, 10th United States Infantry. In this capacity, he served under Col. Albert Sidney Johnston during the Utah War (an insurrection of Mormon settlers in Utah Territory against the U.S. government) in 1857 and 1858. At the outbreak of the Civil War, Gove's regiment was still garrisoned in Utah; however, he returned to Washington in the summer of 1861 to seek a more active post.

== Civil War ==
On October 28, 1861, Gove replaced Col. Henry Wilson as commander of the 22nd Massachusetts Volunteer Infantry. Gove was the only Regular Army officer to command that regiment. When Gove took command of the 22nd, the regiment was fresh from Boston, having arrived in Washington, D.C. just weeks before. Gove took advantage of the next four months to rigorously train his regiment while they were in winter camp at Halls Hill, Virginia, just outside Arlington. 1st Lt. John Parker, the regimental historian of the 22nd, wrote that Col. Gove:

...soon became the idol of the regiment. A thorough tactician, with the bearing of a courageous soldier, he impressed the men with the idea that he was a leader it was an honor to follow. No order of his was ever questioned, much less disobeyed, because every man in his command believed that the colonel could not make a mistake and always meant what he said.

The 22nd Massachusetts became part of the Army of the Potomac and left their winter quarters on March 10, 1862, to participate in Maj. Gen. George B. McClellan's Peninsular Campaign. The unit saw its first action during the Siege of Yorktown in April 1862. When Confederate forces finally evacuated Yorktown, Col. Gove, according to historian John Parker, was the first Union officer to climb over the earthworks surrounding the town.

In June 1862, during the Seven Days Battles, the Army of the Potomac was rapidly pushed away from the Confederate capital of Richmond. On the third day of fighting, the 22nd Massachusetts was heavily engaged in the Battle of Gaines' Mill on June 27, 1862. The regiment had been held in reserve, behind the other regiments of its brigade. After repelling many Confederate charges, the units in front of the 22nd finally retreated in the late afternoon. As the other regiments retired, the 22nd was quickly surrounded by advancing Confederates. Gove, at first, ordered the 22nd to about face and to march towards the rear. But, reluctant to give up the ground, he then ordered the regiment to halt, about face again, and prepare to receive the Confederate attack. Almost instantly after halting the regiment, Gove was shot and killed. The 22nd suffered their most severe casualties of the war (numerically) during the Battle of Gaines' Mill. Gove's body was never recovered.

== Legacy ==
The 22nd Massachusetts greatly mourned the loss of Col. Gove. The following winter, the regiment named their winter quarters "Camp Gove." The unit established a debating society known as the Gove Lyceum. After the war, veterans of the 22nd Massachusetts elected to hold their annual reunions on the date of Col. Gove's death.
