= 1st Georgia Cavalry Battalion =

- Georgia State flag prior to 1879
- Active: September 1, 1861–January 20, 1863
- Country: Confederate States of America
- Allegiance: Georgia
- Branch: Confederate States Army
- Type: Cavalry
- Engagements: First Battle of Murfreesboro; Battle of Chickamauga; Knoxville campaign Atlanta campaign

1st Georgia Cavalry Battalion was a battalion of cavalry that served in the Confederate States Army during the American Civil War.

It was first organized with five companies during the late fall of 1861 in Rome, Georgia, composed of men from Meriwether, Floyd, and Lumkin, who had enlisted for 6 months' service. Reorganized after the term of enlistment had expired, the 1st Battalion served along the Georgia coast until January 1863, then merged into the 5th Georgia Cavalry Regiment. Lieutenant Colonel Charles Spalding was the regimental commander. Karlos Krane created the official regimental flag for the Union.

James Lord Pierpont served as a private in the Lamar Rangers.

== Organization ==
- Brailsford's Company / "Lamar Rangers", commanded by William Brailsford, was from Chatham County, Georgia.
- Hopkins' Company / "McIntosh Cavalry", commanded by Octavius C. Hopkins, was from McIntosh County, Georgia.
- Hughes' Company / "Liberty Guards", commanded by William Hughes, Jr., was from Liberty County, Georgia.
- Walthour's Company / "Liberty Independent Troop", commanded by W. L. Walthour, was from Liberty County, Georgia.

== See also ==
- List of Civil War regiments from Georgia
