= William S. Tilton =

Union Army officer in the American Civil War

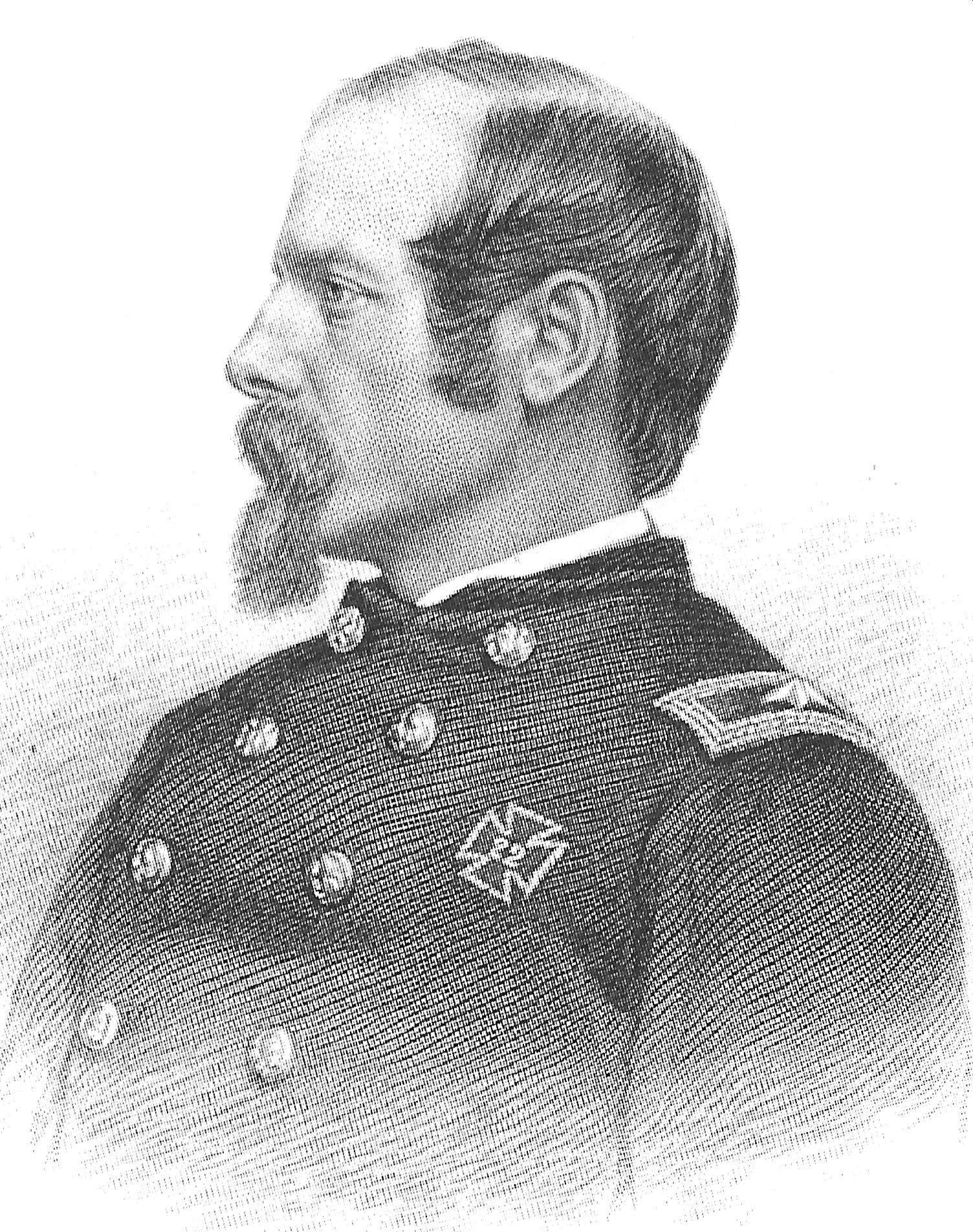
- Born: February 11, 1828; Newburyport, Massachusetts
- Died: March 23, 1889 (aged 61); Newtonville, Massachusetts
- Burial place: Mount Auburn Cemetery Cambridge, Massachusetts
- Military career
- Allegiance: United States of America; Union
- Branch: Union Army
- Service years: 1861–1864
- Rank: Colonel; Brevet Brigadier General
- Commands: 22nd Massachusetts Infantry Regiment; 1st Brigade, 1st Division, V Corps
- Conflicts: American Civil War: Peninsula Campaign; Battle of Antietam; Battle of Fredericksburg; Battle of Gettysburg; Mine Run Campaign; Overland Campaign; Siege of Petersburg
- Other work: Manufacturer and merchant

William Stowell Tilton (February 1, 1828 – March 23, 1889) was an American businessman and soldier who led a regiment, and occasionally a brigade, in the Army of the Potomac during the American Civil War. He and his men were heavily engaged in the Battle of Gettysburg, where Tilton's performance created controversy.

== Early life ==
William Tilton was born in Newburyport, Massachusetts. He was educated in the local schools. He was a manufacturer and merchant in the years before the war.

== Civil War ==
Tilton enlisted in the army and became a first lieutenant in the 22nd Regiment Massachusetts Volunteer Infantry on September 12, 1861. He was promoted to the rank of major on October 2 of that year. Tilton served in the Peninsula Campaign in the army of Maj. Gen. George B. McClellan, serving in the 1st Brigade, 1st Division, V Corps. He was wounded in the shoulder and captured on May 27, 1862, at the Battle of Gaines' Mill. Tilton was exchanged on August 15 of that year. In the meantime, he had become lieutenant colonel of the regiment on June 28. At that rank, he led the regiment in the 1st Brigade, which was led by Col. James Barnes at the Battle of Antietam.

Tilton was made colonel of the 22nd Massachusetts Infantry on October 17, leading the regiment at the Battle of Fredericksburg. In 1863, Tilton continued leading the regiment in the First Brigade, First Division, under Barnes, who had recently become a brigadier general, including at the Battle of Chancellorsville. When Brig. Gen. Charles Griffin went on leave following Chancellorsville, Barnes became acting division commander. Tilton, by seniority, took charge of the First Brigade.

He led the brigade at the Battle of Gettysburg. His command was deployed on the right flank of Col. Jacob B. Sweitzer's 2nd Brigade in between the Peach Orchard and the Wheatfield on July 2, 1863. What followed has remained controversial. When Barnes's division was under attack, he told both brigade commanders they could retreat. Sweitzer saw this as a peremptory command, but Tilton described this in his report as discretionary. Whatever the truth of this, Tilton said he reconnoitered and discovered a large Confederate force coming up on his left flank. This led him to order a retreat. This left a gap in the Federal line, and other veterans later criticized the actions of Tilton and Barnes.

On July 3, the 1st Brigade relieved Col. Strong Vincent's 3rd Brigade, which had passed to Col. James C. Rice after Vincent had been killed in the defense of Little Round Top. Tilton reported only 474 soldiers present for duty at Gettysburg and a loss of 109 from that number. Another estimate is that Tilton lost 125 of 655 men, a loss of 19.1%, a low percentage compared to Sweitzer's 30% reported by the same author.

After Gettysburg, Tilton retained brigade command until August 18, 1863. He returned to regimental command until November 19, when he again resumed brigade command. When the Army of the Potomac was reorganized in 1864 for Lt. Gen. Ulysses S. Grant's Overland Campaign, Tilton was assigned to lead his regiment in Jacob Sweitzer's brigade of Griffin's division. He served in that role in the Battle of the Wilderness, the Battle of Spotsylvania Court House, and the Battle of Cold Harbor, as well as in the early stages of the Siege of Petersburg. Tilton remained in regimental command until June 18, 1864, when he again became acting brigade commander until August 22. During this time he was engaged in action at the battles of Jerusalem Plank Road and Globe Tavern.

Tilton was mustered out of volunteer service on October 17 of that year. On December 12, 1864, President Abraham Lincoln nominated Tilton for the award of the honorary grade of brevet brigadier general, United States Volunteers, to rank from September 9, 1864, for distinguished services during the war. The U.S. Senate confirmed the award on February 20, 1865.

== Postbellum activities ==
In 1866 General Tilton became a member of the Ancient and Honorable Artillery Company of Massachusetts. He was also a member of the Massachusetts Commandery of the Military Order of the Loyal Legion of the United States.

Tilton served as governor of the National Soldiers' Home in Togus, Maine, from 1869 to 1883. He retired to a home in Boston, Massachusetts.

He died in Newtonville, Massachusetts, and was buried at Mount Auburn Cemetery in Cambridge, Massachusetts.

== See also ==
- List of Massachusetts generals in the American Civil War
