= Harrison Jeffords =

Union Army officer

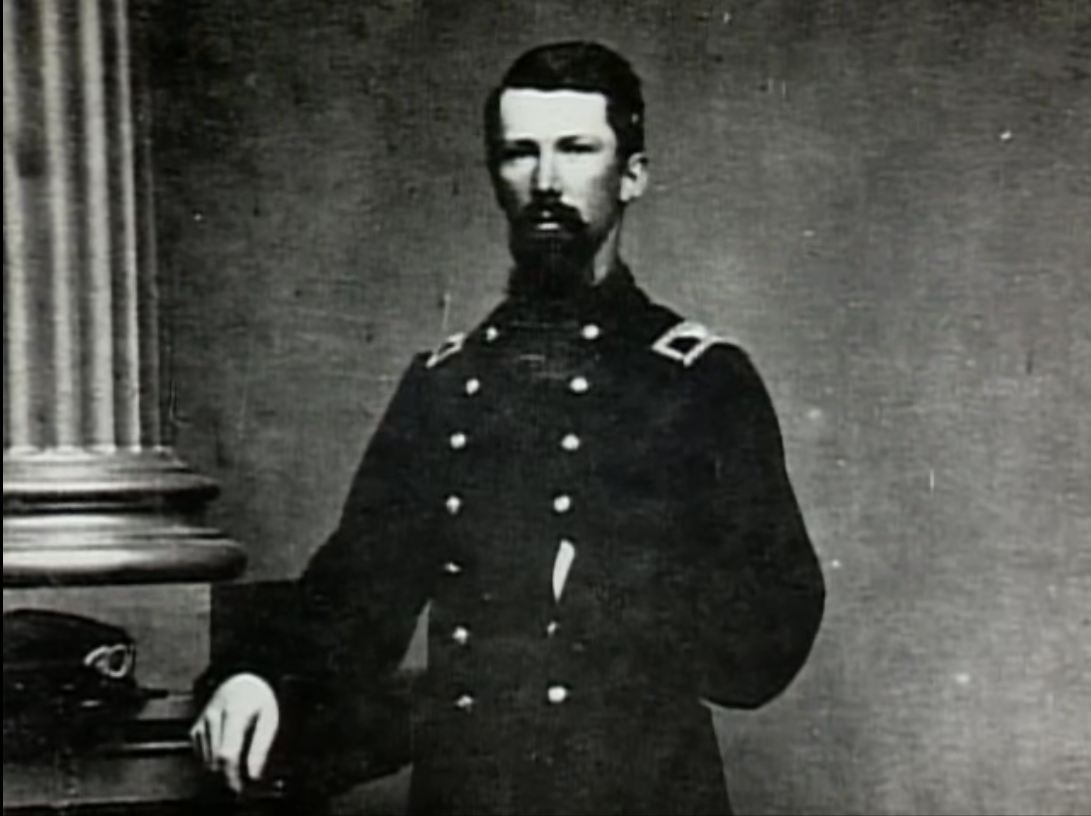
- Born: August 21, 1836; Monroe County, New York, US
- Died: July 3, 1863 (aged 26); Gettysburg, Pennsylvania, US
- Military career
- Allegiance: United States of America; Union
- Branch: (United States) Union Army
- Service years: 1861–1863
- Rank: Colonel
- Unit: 4th Michigan Volunteer Infantry Regiment
- Conflicts: American Civil War Battle of Chancellorsville Battle of Gettysburg †

Harrison H. Jeffords (August 21, 1836 – July 3, 1863) was the Colonel of the 4th Michigan Volunteer Infantry Regiment in the Union Army of the Potomac during the American Civil War. He was noted for his heroism on July 2, 1863, during the Battle of Gettysburg, in which he died while protecting the United States flag.

Jeffords was born in New York, but his family eventually moved to Michigan, where Harrison soon took up the study of law. As a practicing lawyer in Dexter, Michigan during the outbreak of the Civil War, his patriotism urged him to enlist in the Fourth Michigan Volunteer Infantry as a lieutenant in Company K. Later, on May 1, 1862, he became captain of Company C, and later rose to the command of the regiment, as its Colonel, on November 26, 1862. The Fourth Michigan Infantry and Harrison Jeffords saw action in several of the major battles in the Eastern Theater while serving in the Army of the Potomac.

While Colonel Jeffords was back in Michigan on a recruiting trip, the ladies of Monroe, Michigan, presented him with a new national flag to replace the regiment's original flag, which had been badly damaged in recent battles. Jeffords stated that he would defend the flag with his life.

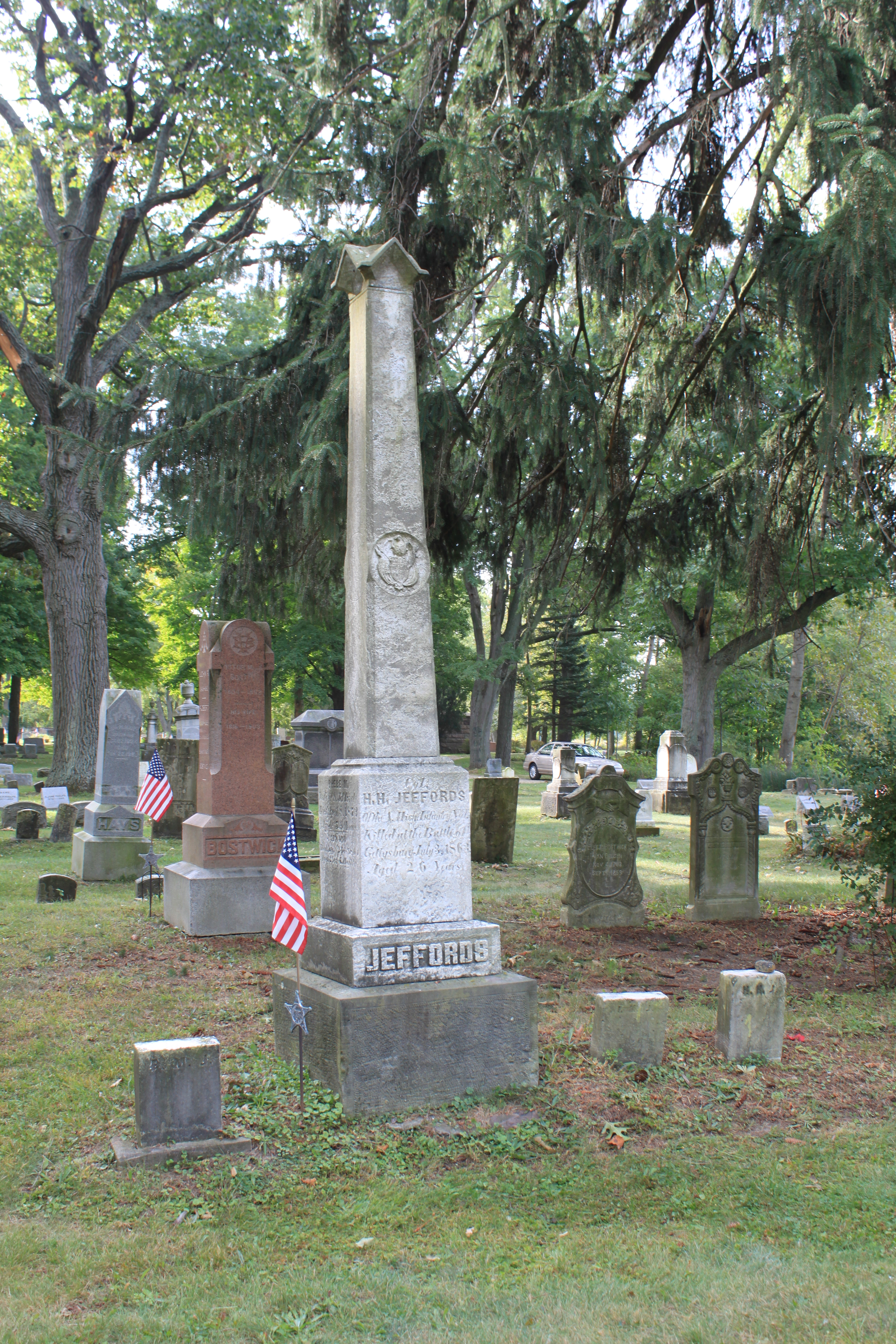
Jeffords' grave

During the second day at Gettysburg, the color-bearer of the regiment dropped this flag, and as Colonel Jeffords advanced to retrieve it, he fought with the Confederate soldier who had seized the flag, as he grasped the banner himself. In the ensuing melee, Jeffords received a gunshot wound to the thigh and was bayoneted by a Confederate soldier in the left abdomen, a mortal wound for the 26-year-old officer. He died at 4 am the next day, on July 3, 1863. His final words were said to be "Mother, mother, mother." Jeffords became the highest commissioned officer in the Civil War to die of a bayonet wound. His body was sent home to Dexter, Michigan, after the battle, where approximately 2,000 people attended the funeral of its beloved hero. He is buried at Forest Lawn Cemetery in Dexter.

After the war, the regiment erected its monument on the battlefield near the point at which the colonel fell. Despite popular belief, the monument's image of the color-bearer is not a representation of Colonel Harrison Herbert Jeffords. Besides lacking Colonel Jefford's ever-present "goatee" styled beard, the soldier depicted does not have on the Colonel's uniform, but is actually outfitted according to postwar army regulation. However, there is a verse inscribed in dedication to the Fourth Michigan's fallen leader, on the opposite side of the monument.

== In popular media ==
- In the eighth episode of the eighth season of "The Office", in the episode entitled "Gettysburg", character Andy Bernard mentions Jeffords while talking about battle flags.
- Jeffords also appears in Civil War Combat's first episode, The Wheatfield at Gettysburg, which describes his death.
- Civil War Journal also mentions Jeffords and his flag in the episode, "Banners of Glory."
