= Marshall S. Pike =

American poet

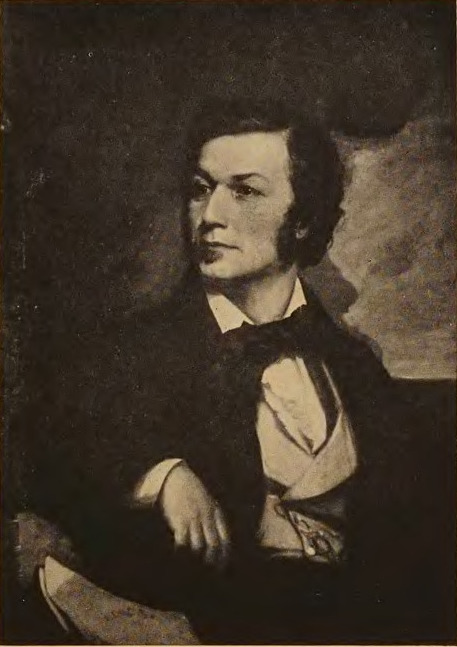
- portrait by John Neagle
- Born: May 20, 1818; Westborough (CDP)
- Died: February 13, 1901; Upton
- Occupation: Songwriter
- Notable work: Home Again

Marshall S. Pike (May 20, 1818 – February 13, 1901) was an American songwriter and poet. He was known for his song "Home Again" published in 1850. He wrote lyrics in collaboration with James Pierpont for the song "The Little White Cottage" or "Gentle Nettie Moore" published by Oliver Ditson and Company, and copyrighted on September 16, 1857. The songwriting credit appeared as: "Poetry by Marshall S. Pike, Esq."

== Life and career ==
Marshall Spring Pike was born on May 20, 1818, in Westborough, Massachusetts. He began to write music and verses at 14 years old. In 1843 he formed a quartet with John Powers, James Powers, and L.V.H Crosby called the "Albino Family".

Mr. Pike served in the American Civil War as Drum Major of the 22nd Massachusetts Volunteer Infantry for three years and was discharged in 1862. He was taken prisoner at the Battle of Gaines' Mill and sent to Libby Prison, where he formed a Glee Club to entertain fellow prisoners.

After the war he toured New England as a member of the Pike and Glunn Combination.

Bob Dylan based his 2006 song "Nettie Moore" from the Modern Times album on his 1857 composition "Gentle Nettie Moore". The 1857 song co-written with James Lord Pierpont is about a man pining for a girl sold into slavery, shackled with chains, and taken away from the little white cottage as a slave laborer.

The Sons of the Pioneers with Roy Rogers released a recording of "Gentle Nettie Moore" in 1934. Judy Martin also recorded the song with Her Mountain Rangers group. Bobby Horton also recorded the song on his 2015 album Homespun Songs of 19th Century America.

== Compositions ==
- "Harmoneons Carolina Melodies", 1840
- "Oh Give Me a Home if in Foreign Land", 1845
- "Home Again", 1850
- "The Lone Starry Hours. Serenade", 1850
- "Happy Are We Tonight", 1850
- "Gentle Nettie Moore", with James Lord Pierpont, 1857
- "Rocklawn Summer Wildwood. Song", 1862
