= 4th Michigan Infantry Regiment =

- Michigan state flag
- Active: June 20, 1861, to June 30, 1864
- Country: United States
- Allegiance: Union
- Branch: Infantry
- Engagements: First Battle of Bull Run; Peninsular Campaign; Second Battle of Bull Run; Battle of Chantilly; Battle of Antietam; Battle of Fredericksburg; Battle of Chancellorsville; Battle of Gettysburg; Battle of the Wilderness; Battle of Spotsylvania Court House; Battle of Cold Harbor

The 4th Michigan Infantry Regiment was an infantry regiment that served in the Union Army during the American Civil War. The 4th Michigan wore a very Americanized zouave uniform. This uniform consisted of a Federal dark blue 4 button sack coat, dark blue chasseur trousers, tan gaiters, and a maroon zouave fez with a light blue tassel.

== Service ==
The 4th Michigan Infantry was organized at Adrian, Michigan and mustered into Federal service for a three-year enlistment on June 20, 1861. The regiment's first lieutenant colonel was a future prominent politician and civil engineer, William Ward Duffield. Several other soldiers in the regiment reached post-war prominence, including politician George Spalding and Major General Alfred E. Bates, who enlisted as privates in Company A.

The regiment was mustered out on June 30, 1864. The regiment's veterans and recruits were assigned to the 1st Michigan Infantry.The Fourth Michigan Infantry was reorganized under orders of July 26, 1864 and mustered into Federal service as a regiment on October 14, 1864. On May 26, 1866, the regiment was mustered out of service in Houston, Texas.

== Total strength and casualties ==
The regiment suffered 12 officers and 177 enlisted men who were killed in action or mortally wounded and 1 officer and 107 enlisted men who died of disease, for a total of 297 fatalities.

== Commanders ==
- Colonel Dwight A. Woodbury †, killed at the Battle of Malvern Hill, July 1, 1862
- Colonel Harrison Jeffords †, killed at the Battle of Gettysburg
- Colonel Jonathan W. Childs Antietam
- Colonel George W. Lumbard † (DOW), died on May 6, 1864, from the wounds he received in action on the previous day at Wilderness, Virginia.

== 4th Michigan Soldiers ==
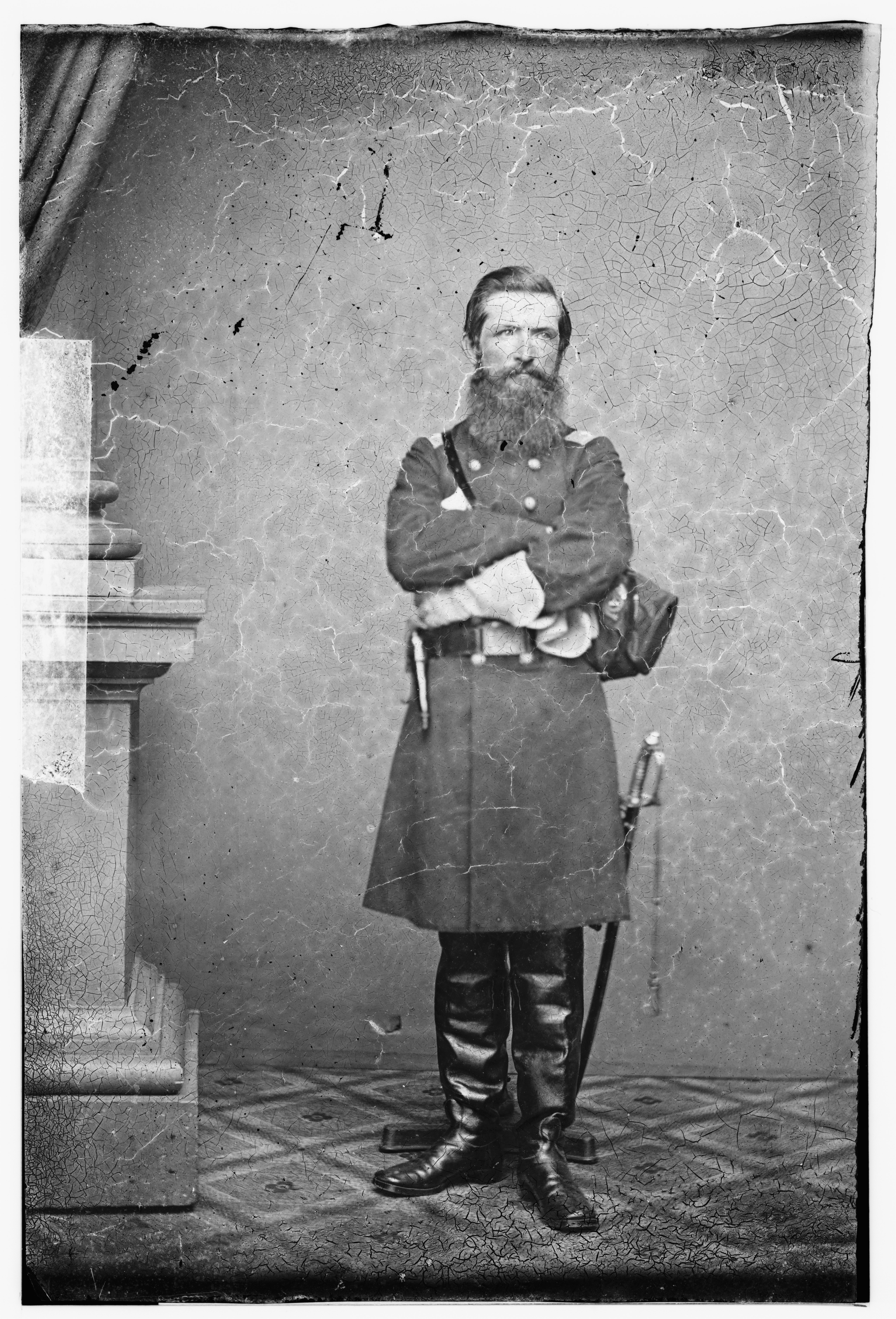
Colonel Dwight A. Woodbury

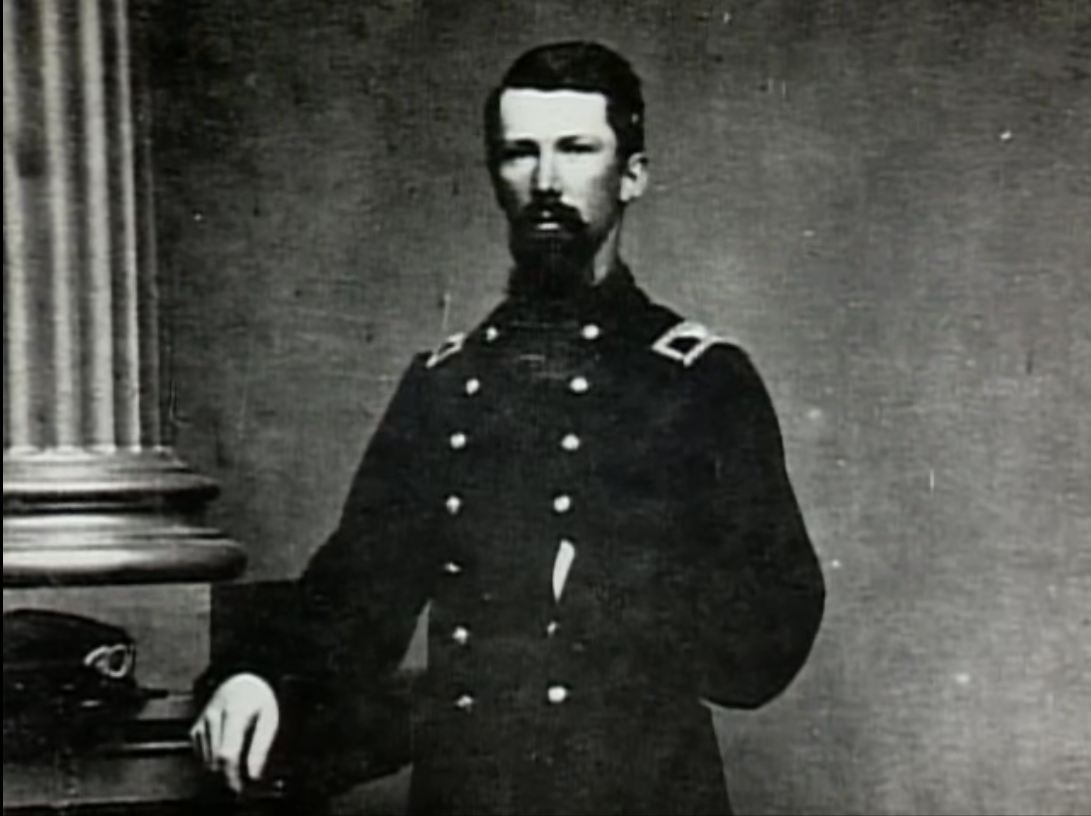
Colonel Harrison H. Jeffords

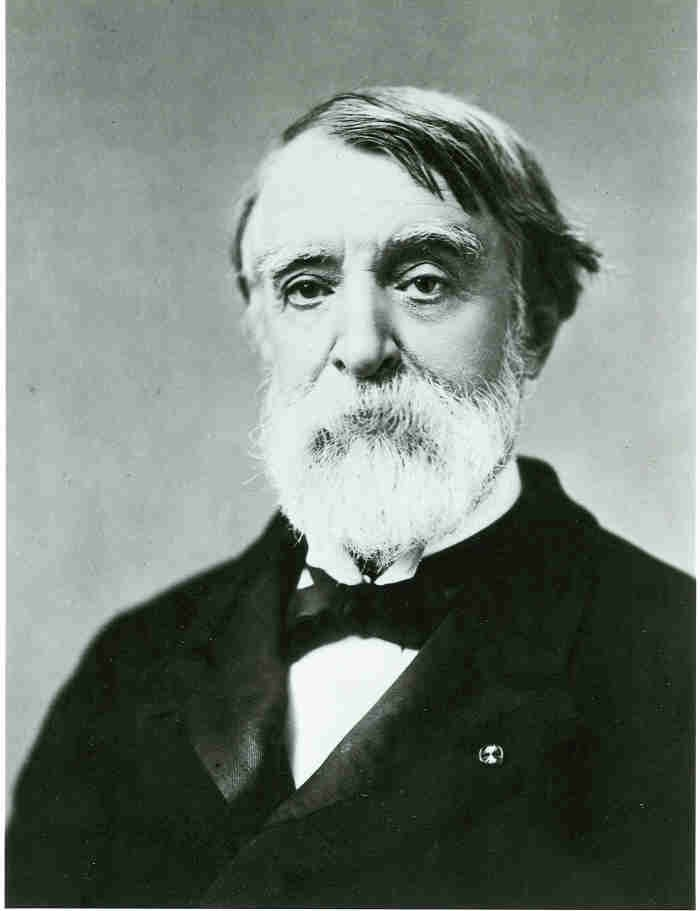
Lieutenant colonel William Ward Duffield

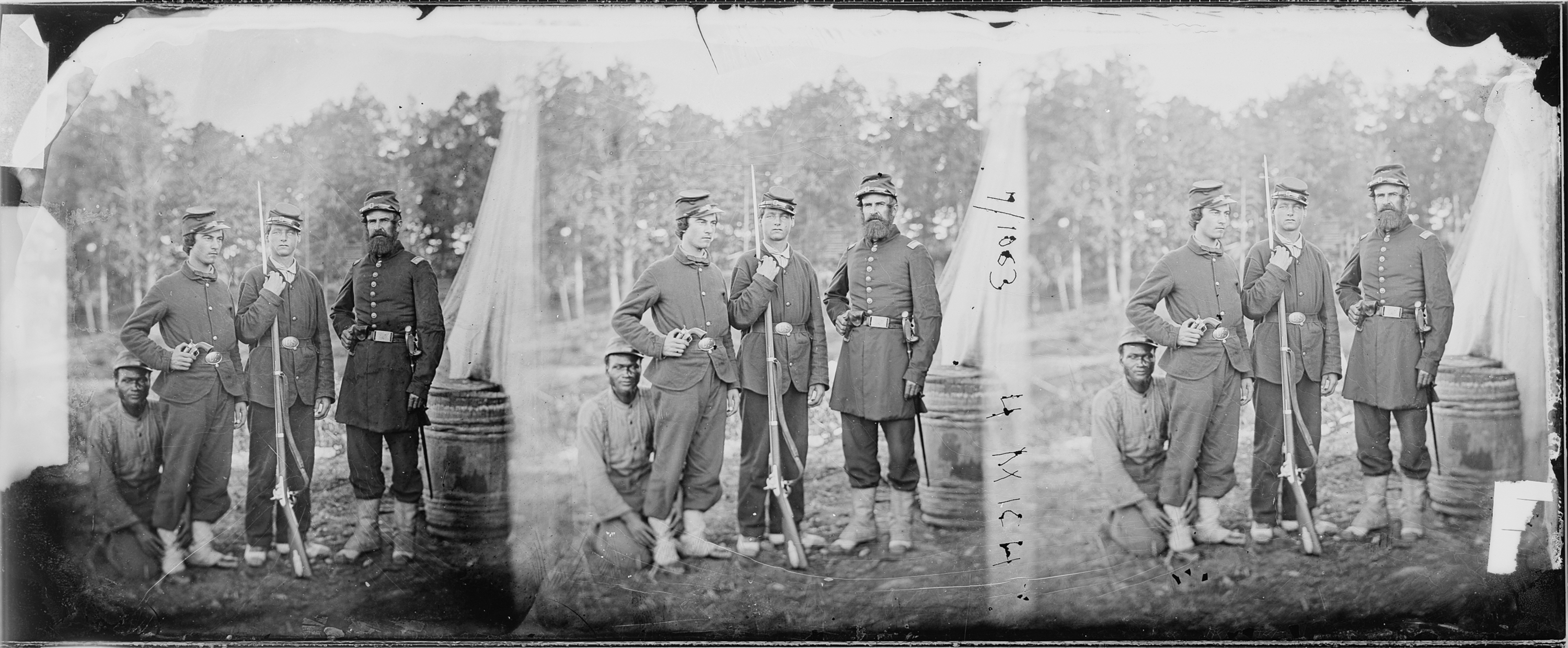
Lt Parker and 4th Mich Soldiers

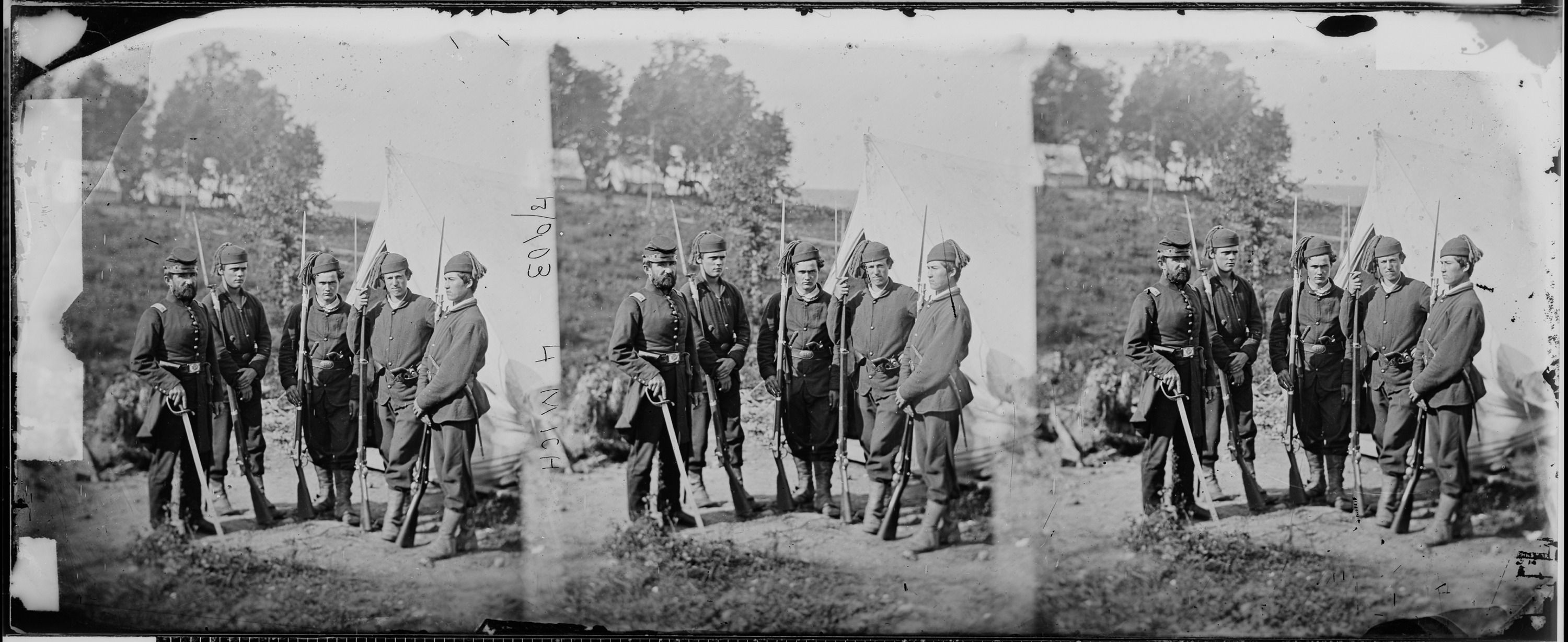

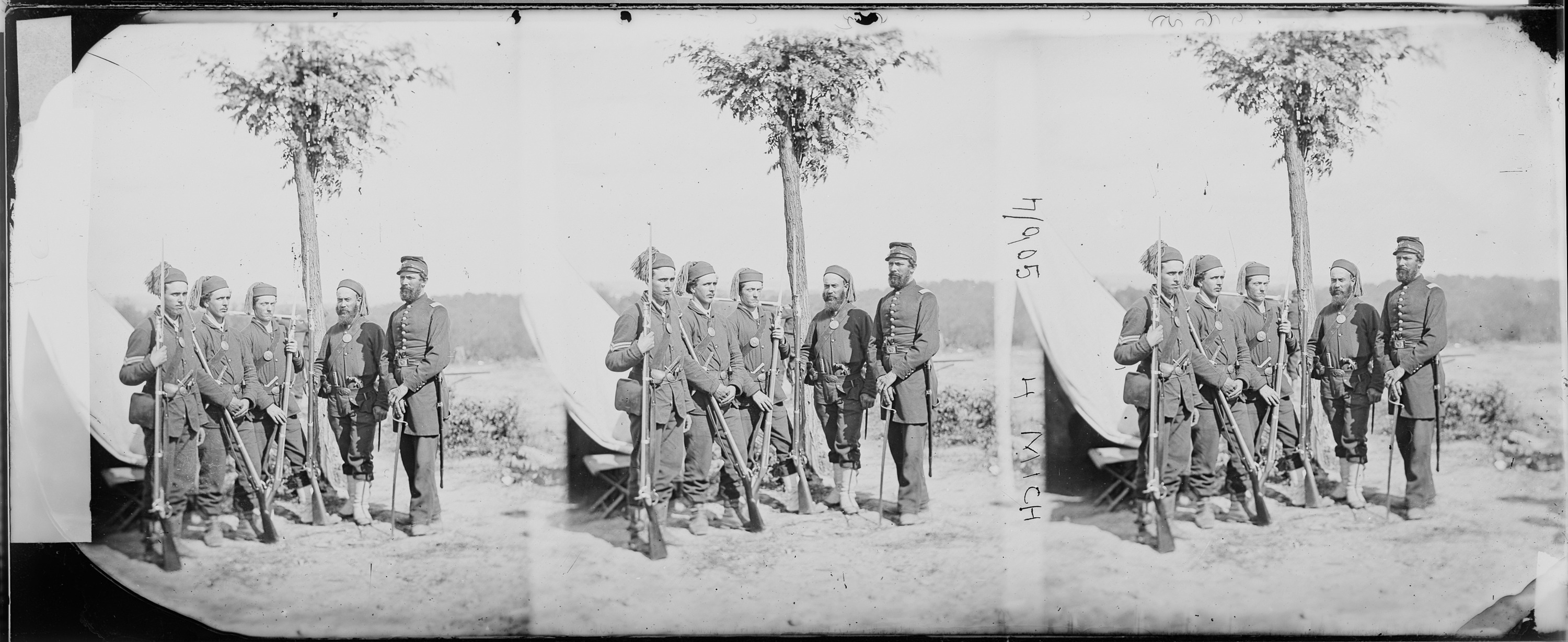

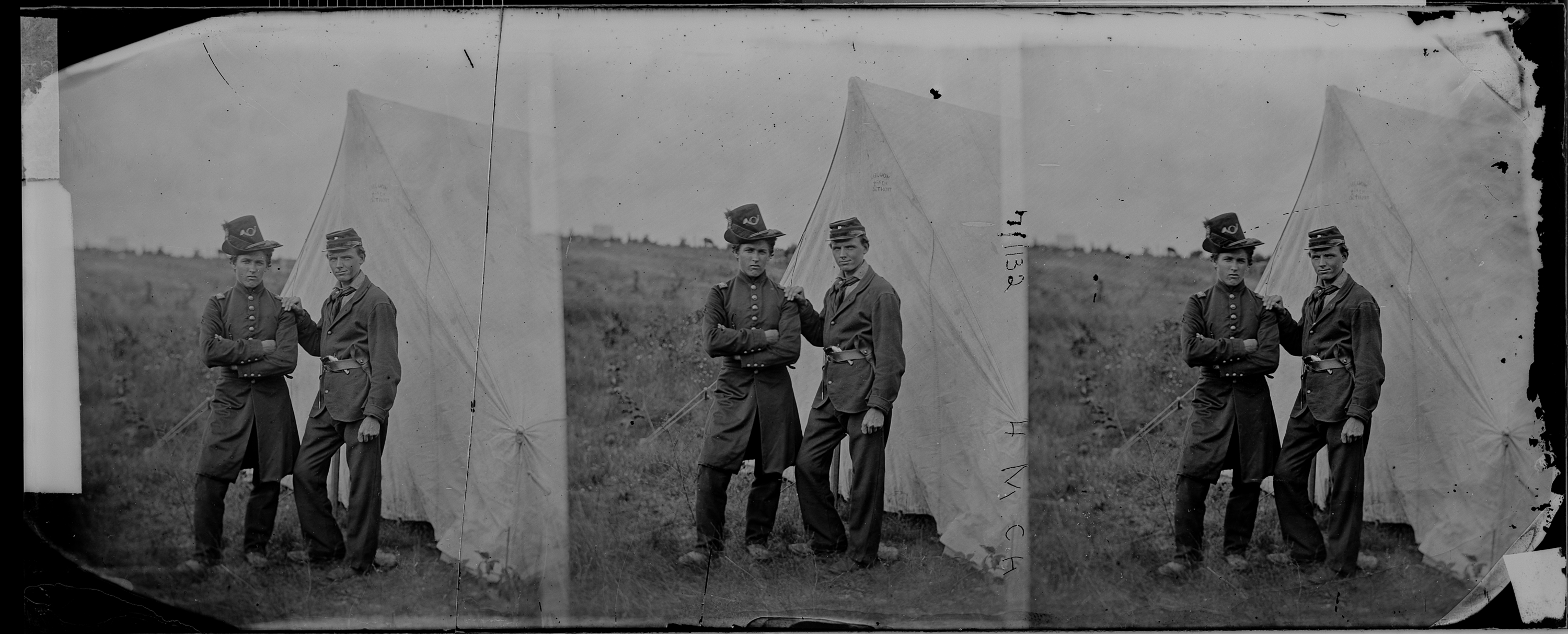

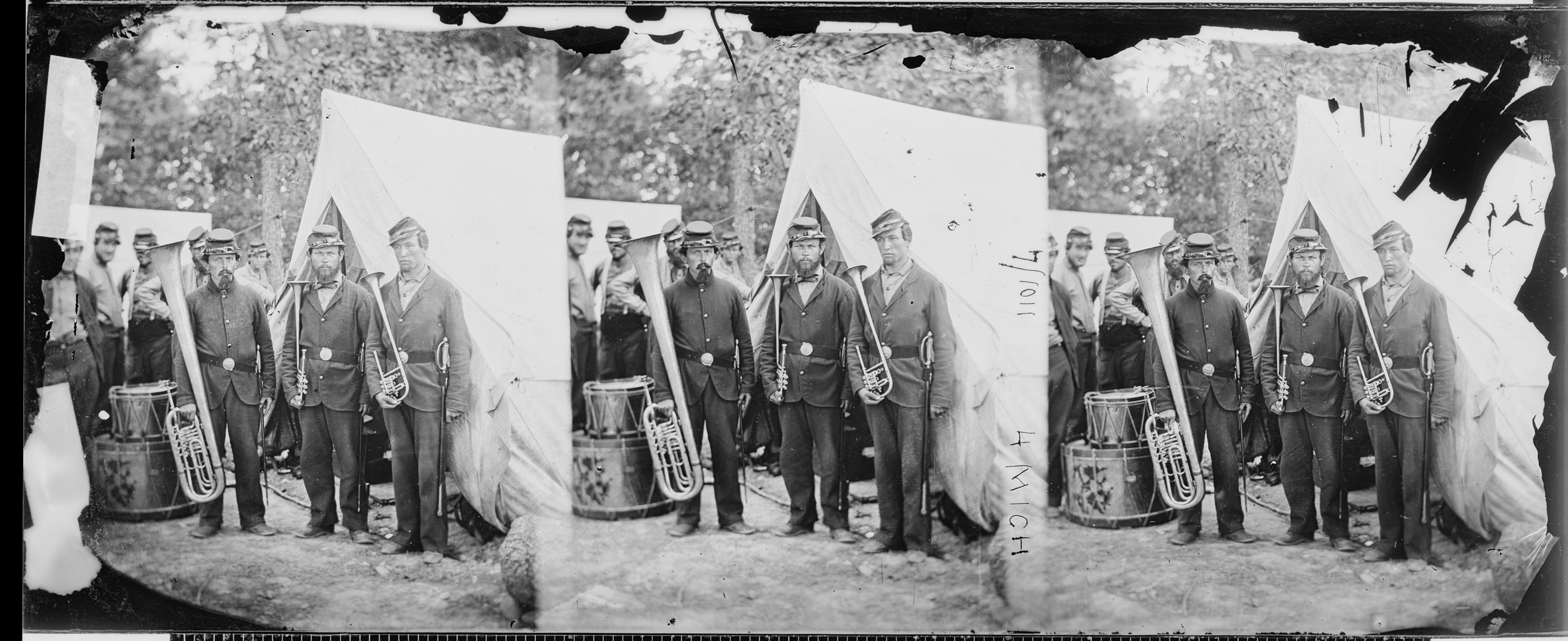
Band of the 4th Michigan Infantry

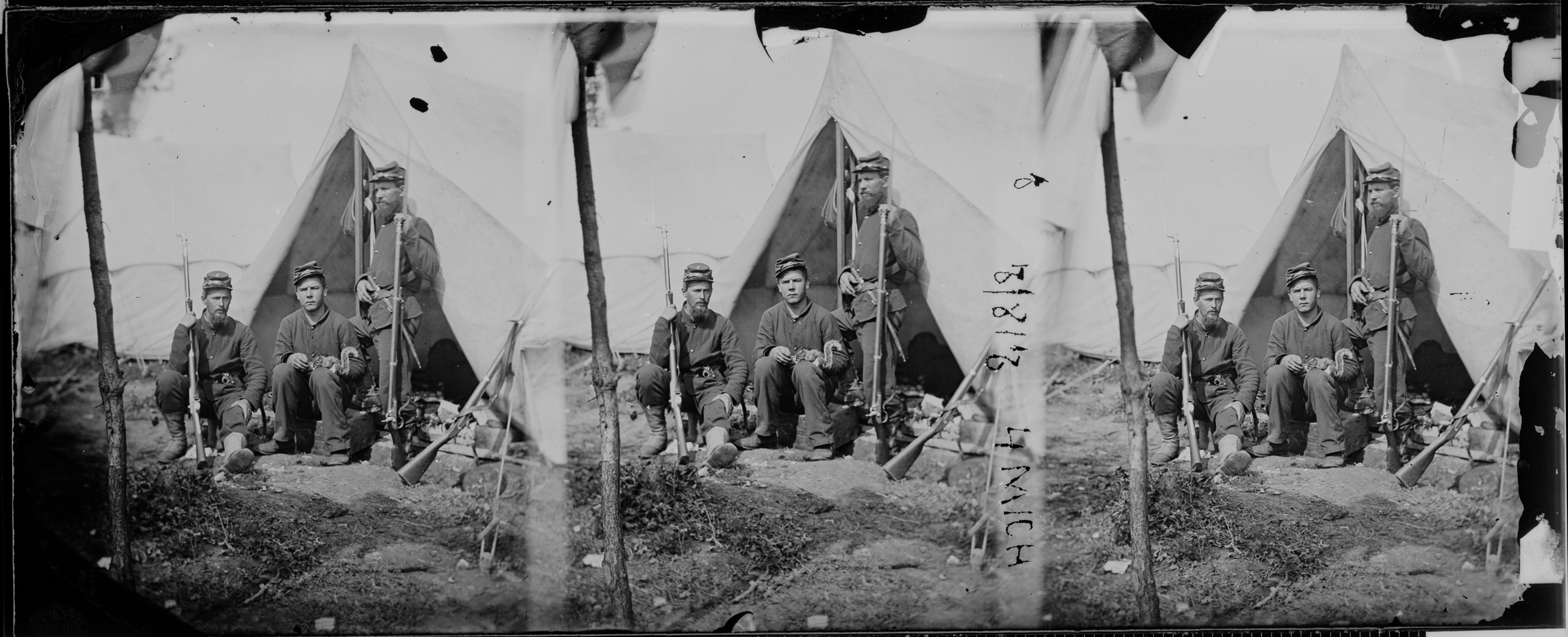

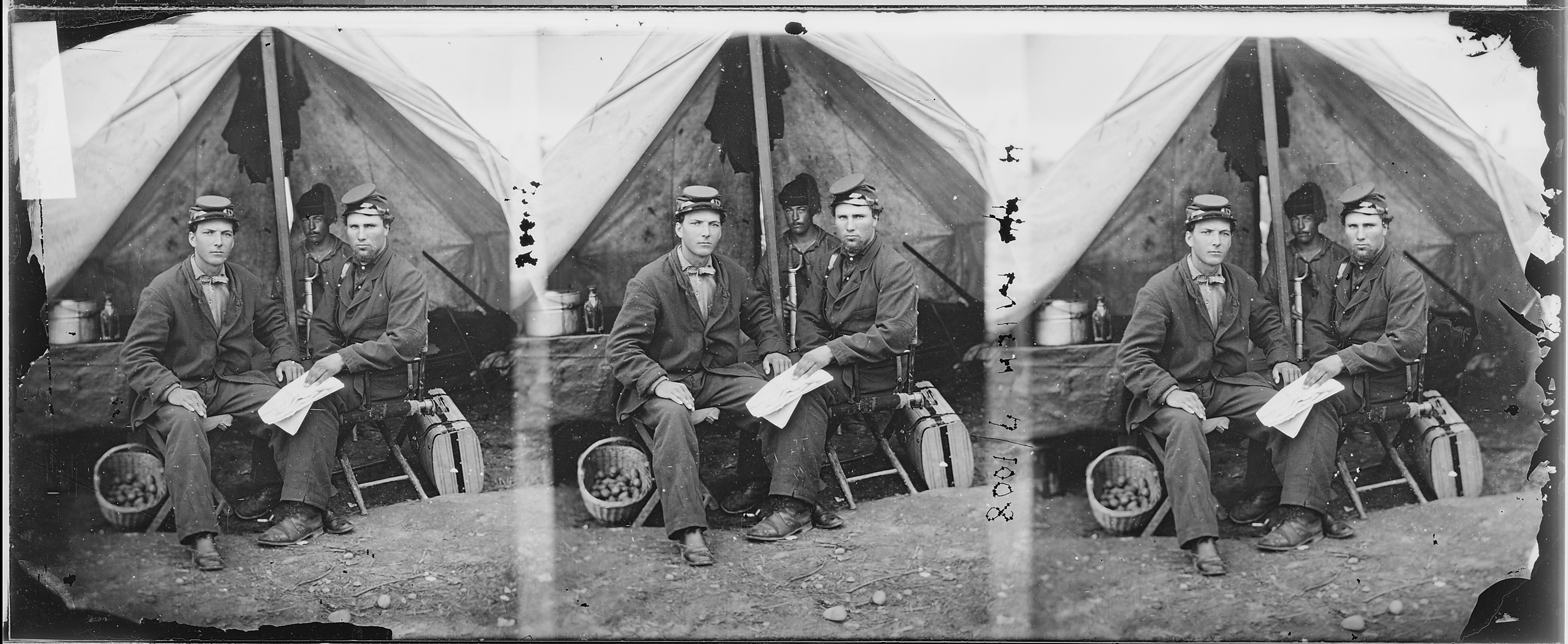

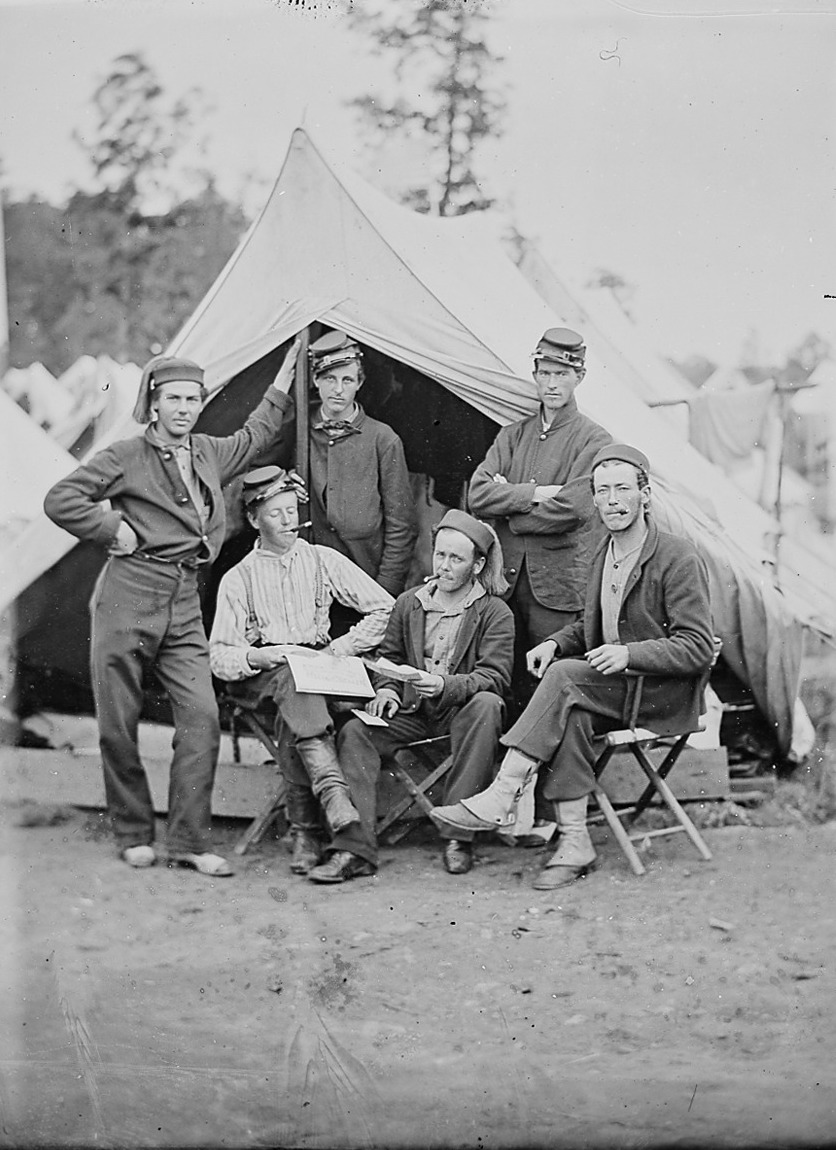
Company "F", 4th Infantry photographed by Mathew Brady

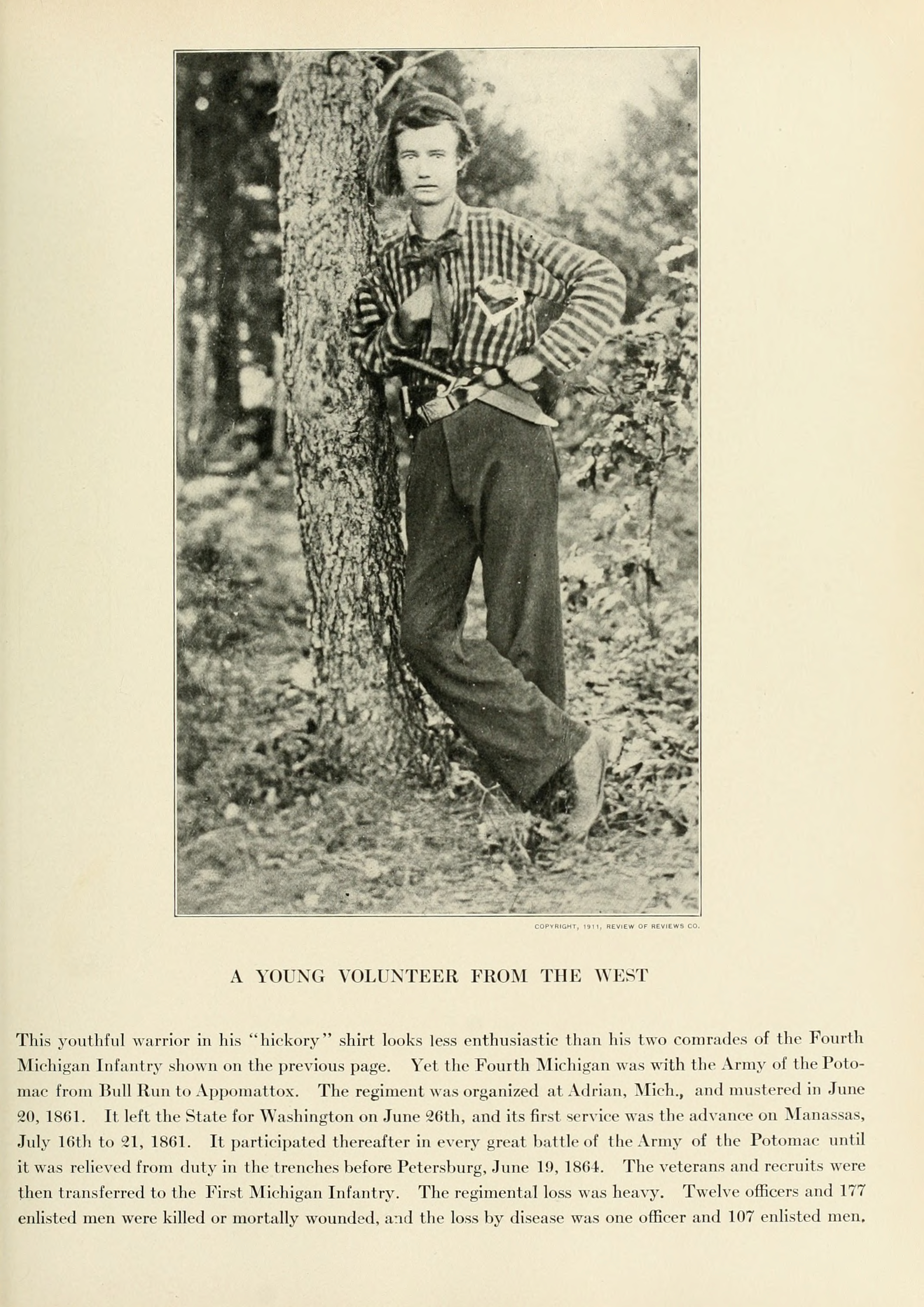
Richard Cramer Company I 4th Michigan Infantry. See.

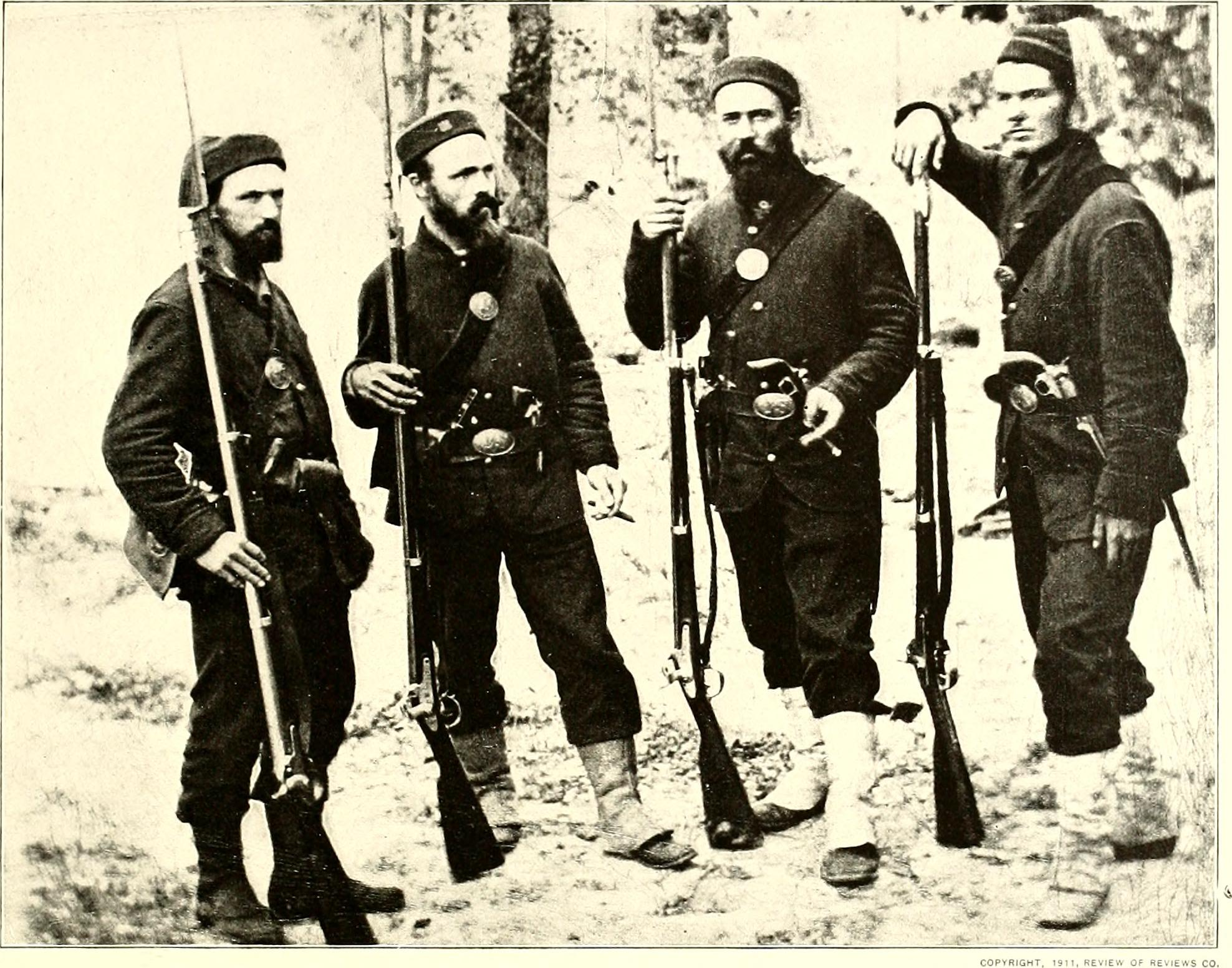
Soldiers from the West in the 4th infantry photographed by Mathew Brady

== See also ==
- List of Michigan Civil War Units
- Michigan in the American Civil War
