= Clemson–South Carolina rivalry =

American college sports rivalry

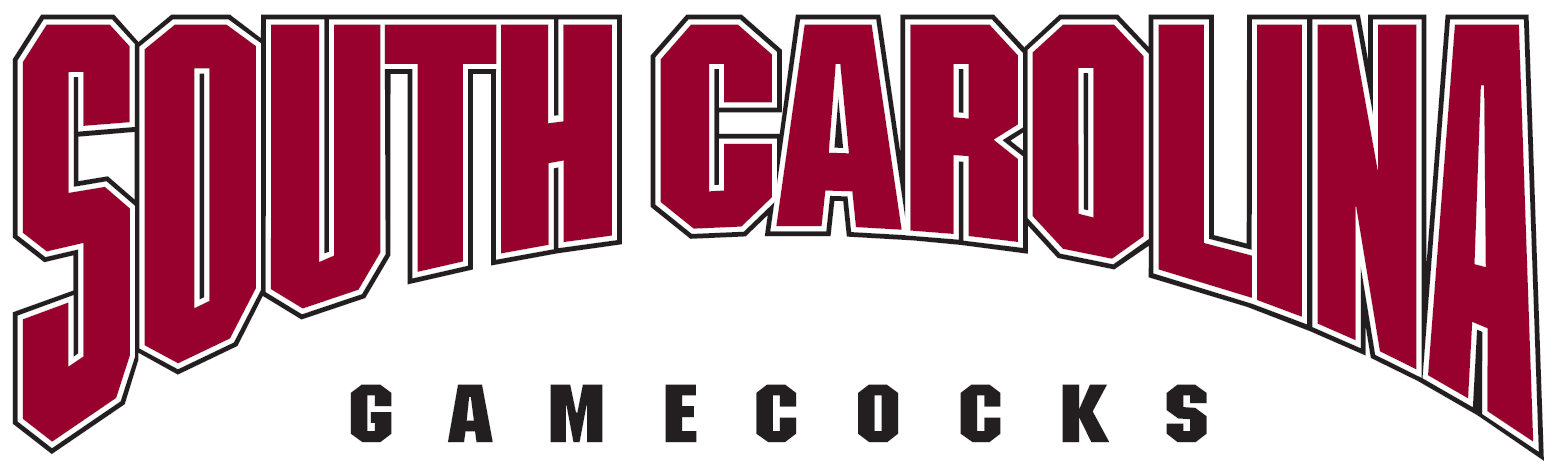
Locations of Clemson and South Carolina

The Clemson–South Carolina rivalry is an American collegiate athletic rivalry between the Clemson University Tigers and the University of South Carolina Gamecocks, the two largest universities in the state of South Carolina. Since 2015, the two compete in the Palmetto Series, which consists of more than a dozen athletic, head-to-head matchups. Both institutions are public universities supported by the state, and their campuses are separated by only 132 miles. South Carolina and Clemson have been bitter rivals since 1896, and a heated rivalry continues to this day for a variety of reasons, including the historic tensions regarding their respective charters and the passions surrounding their athletic programs. It has often been listed as one of the best rivalries in college sports. (Note: Sources:)

Much like the Alabama–Auburn rivalry, the Clemson–South Carolina rivalry is an in-state collegiate rivalry. However, unlike Alabama–Auburn, this is one of a handful of rivalries where the teams are in different premier conferences: South Carolina is in the Southeastern Conference (SEC); Clemson is in the Atlantic Coast Conference (ACC).

The annual football game is considered the most important sporting event in the state. It was played first in 1896 and every year from 1909 to 2019, one of the longest uninterrupted rivalries in college football history. Until 1959, the game was played during the State Fair in Columbia, on "Big Thursday", a state holiday. Since 1960, the two schools have alternated hosting on Saturdays. In 2014, the annual football game was officially dubbed the Palmetto Bowl. As a result of the global COVID-19 pandemic, the 2020 meeting of the two football teams was canceled, ending an unbroken streak of 111 years of games. The game has never been contested anywhere besides Columbia or Clemson. Clemson leads the series 74–44–4, and won the most recent game with a score of 28–14.

== Origin ==
=== Background ===
College Comparison
	Clemson	South Carolina
Founded	1889	1801
Location	Clemson, SC	Columbia, SC
Conference	ACC	SEC
Students	24,951	34,795
School colors		
Nickname	Tigers	Gamecocks
Mascot	The Tiger	Cocky

Unlike most major college rivalries, the South Carolina–Clemson rivalry did not start innocently or because of competitive collegiate sports. The deep-seated bitterness began between the two schools long before Clemson received its charter and became a college. The two institutions were founded eighty-eight years apart: South Carolina College in 1801 and Clemson Agricultural College in 1889.

South Carolina College was founded in 1801 to unite and promote harmony between the Lowcountry and the Backcountry. It closed during the Civil War when its students joined the Confederate Army, but the closure gave politicians an opportunity to reorganize it to their liking. The Radical Republicans in charge of state government during Reconstruction opened the school to blacks and women while appropriating generous funds to the university, which caused the white citizens of the state to withdraw their support for the university and view it as a symbol of the worst aspects of Reconstruction.

The Democrats returned to power in 1877 following their electoral victory over the Radical Republicans and promptly proceeded to close the university. Sentiment in the state favored opening an agriculture college, so the university was reorganized as the South Carolina College of Agriculture and Mechanic Arts. In 1882, the college was renamed to its antebellum name, South Carolina College, which infuriated the farmers who felt that the politicians had frustrated the will of the people by de-emphasizing agriculture education, even though the school still retained the department of agriculture. Clemson, from its beginning, was an all-white male military school. The school remained this way until 1955 when it changed to "civilian" status for students and became a coeducational institution.

=== Agitation from the farmers ===
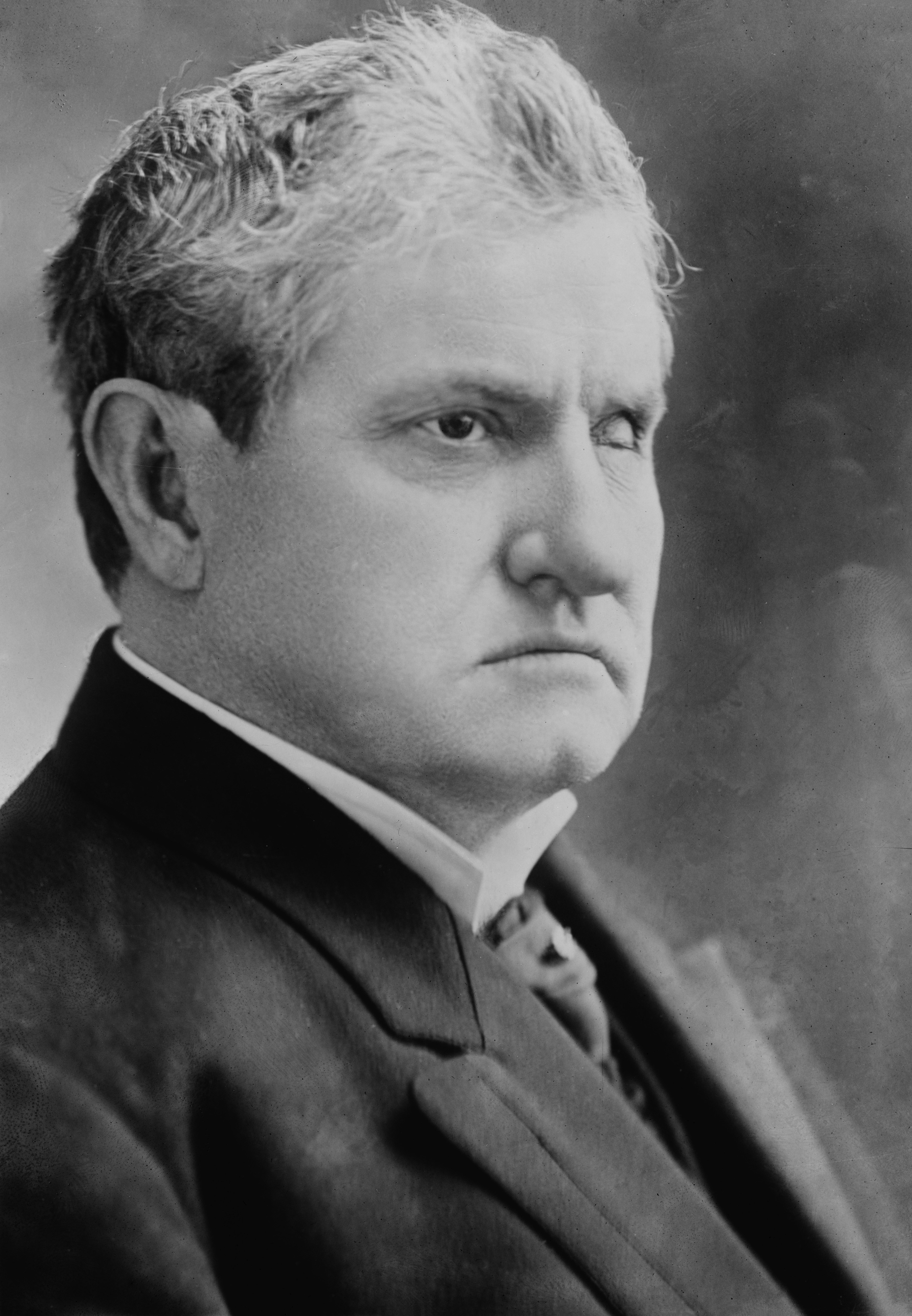
Benjamin Tillman was instrumental in the founding of Clemson University and early antagonism between the two schools

Benjamin Tillman emerged in the 1880s as a leader of the agrarian movement in South Carolina and demanded that the South Carolina College take agricultural education more seriously by expanding the agriculture department. In 1885, Tillman was convinced of the superiority of a separate agricultural college by Stephen D. Lee, then the president of the Agricultural and Mechanical College of the State of Mississippi, and subsequently Tillman would accept nothing less than a separate agriculture college in South Carolina. He offered the following reasons why he felt that it was necessary to have a separate agriculture college outside the confines of Columbia:

1. Mississippi A&M featured practical training without unnecessary studying of the liberal arts.
2. Mississippi A&M provided poor students work-scholarships so that they could attend the college.
3. There were too few students who studied agriculture at the college to justify an agriculture college there.
4. The college was a place "for the sons of lawyers and of the well-to-do" who sneered at the agriculture students as if they were hayseeds.
5. The students at the college lived a life of luxury as compared with the sweat and toil endured by students at Mississippi A&M.
6. There was not enough farm land near the college to allow for proper agriculture study.

The Conservatives, who held the reins of power in South Carolina from 1877 to 1890, replied to each point made by Tillman:

1. The most advanced agriculture educational research was being conducted at the University of California and at Cornell University, both of which combined agriculture colleges with liberal arts colleges. Additionally, a separate agriculture college would be more expensive and result in an inferior product.
2. The work scholarships attracted the lowest quality of students who only cared about obtaining a college degree, not about an education in agriculture or mechanical studies. Furthermore, there was little advantage of attending a college only to pitch manure and grub stumps.
3. The constant attacks by Tillman on the college caused many to doubt whether state support for the institution would continue. As a result, the enrollment numbers were not impressive, although the numbers of students taking agriculture and mechanical classes increased from 34 in 1887 to 83 in 1889.
4. Over half of the students at the college were the sons of farmers, though most did not study agriculture as Tillman wished. John McLaren McBryde, President of the college, correctly predicted that most students of an agriculture college would not go back to work the farm after graduation.
5. While some students at the college were the sons of the well-to-do, the majority were poor.
6. The college farm added 100 acres (0.4 km^{2}) in 1887, just one mile from campus.

=== Clemson's will ===
Tillman was bolstered in 1886 when Thomas Green Clemson agreed to will his Fort Hill estate for the establishment of an agriculture college. Yet, Tillman did not want to wait until Clemson died to start a separate agriculture college so he pushed the General Assembly to use the Morrill funds and Hatch funds for that purpose. Instead, the legislature gave those funds to the South Carolina College in 1887 which would use them along with a greater state appropriation to reorganize itself as the second University of South Carolina and additionally, to expand the agriculture department greatly. After this victory for South Carolina, in January 1888 Tillman wrote a letter to the News and Courier that he was retiring from public life.

Political factions in the 1880s
	Tillmanites	Conservatives
Favored college	Clemson	South Carolina
Figurehead leader	Benjamin Tillman	Wade Hampton III
Political ideology	Agrarian populism	Conservatism
Base of support	The Upstate; rural	Statewide; urban
Confederate service	50.0%	79.1%

It was less than ninety days when Tillman reemerged on the scene upon the death of Thomas Green Clemson in April 1888. Tillman advocated that the state accept the gift by Clemson, but the Conservatives in power opposed the move and an all out war for power in the state commenced. The opening salvo was fired by Gideon Lee, the father of Clemson's granddaughter and John C. Calhoun's great-granddaughter Floride Isabella Lee, who wrote a letter on her behalf to the News and Courier in May that she was being denied as Calhoun's rightful heir. Furthermore, he stated that Clemson was egotistical and "only wanted to erect a monument to his own name." In November, Lee filed a lawsuit in Federal Court to contest the will which ultimately ruled against him in May 1889.

The election of 1888 afforded Tillman an opportunity to convince the politicians to accept the Clemson bequest or face the possibility of being voted out of office. He demanded that the Democratic party nominate its candidates by the primary system, which was denied, but they did accept his request that the candidates for statewide office canvass the state. Tillman proved excellent on the stump, by far superior to his Conservative opponents, and as the Democratic convention neared there was a clear groundswell of support for the acceptance of Clemson's estate.

=== Clemson's Bequest barely wins support ===
Tillman explained his justification for an independently controlled agriculture college by pointing to the mismanagement and political interference of the University of South Carolina as had occurred during Reconstruction. The agriculture college, as specified in Clemson's will, was to be privately controlled. With declining cotton prices, Tillman played upon the farmer's desperation by stating that the salaries of the college professors were exorbitant and it must be a sign of corruption. Consequently, the legislature was compelled to pass the bill to accept Clemson's bequest in December 1888, albeit with the tie-breaking vote in the state Senate from Lieutenant Governor William L. Mauldin. Thus was reborn the antagonistic feelings of regional bitterness and class division that would plague the state for decades.

Having achieved his agriculture college, Tillman was not content to sit idly by because what he really desired was power and political office. After winning the 1890 election and becoming governor, Tillman renewed the attacks on the Conservatives and those who had thwarted his agriculture college. He saved the coup de grâce for Senator Wade Hampton III, a South Carolina College graduate and Confederate General during the Civil War, who "invoked Confederate service and honor as a barrier to Tillmanism." Tillman directed the legislature to defeat Hampton's renomination for another term in December 1890.

While campaigning for governor in 1890, Tillman leveled his harshest criticism towards the University of South Carolina and threatened to close it along with The Citadel, which he called a "dude factory." Despite the rhetoric, Tillman only succeeded in reorganizing the University of South Carolina into a liberal arts college while in office. It would eventually be rechartered for the last time in 1906 as the University of South Carolina. However, Clemson Agricultural College held sway over the state legislature for decades and was generally the more popular college during the first half of the 20th century in South Carolina.

=== Growth Battle ===
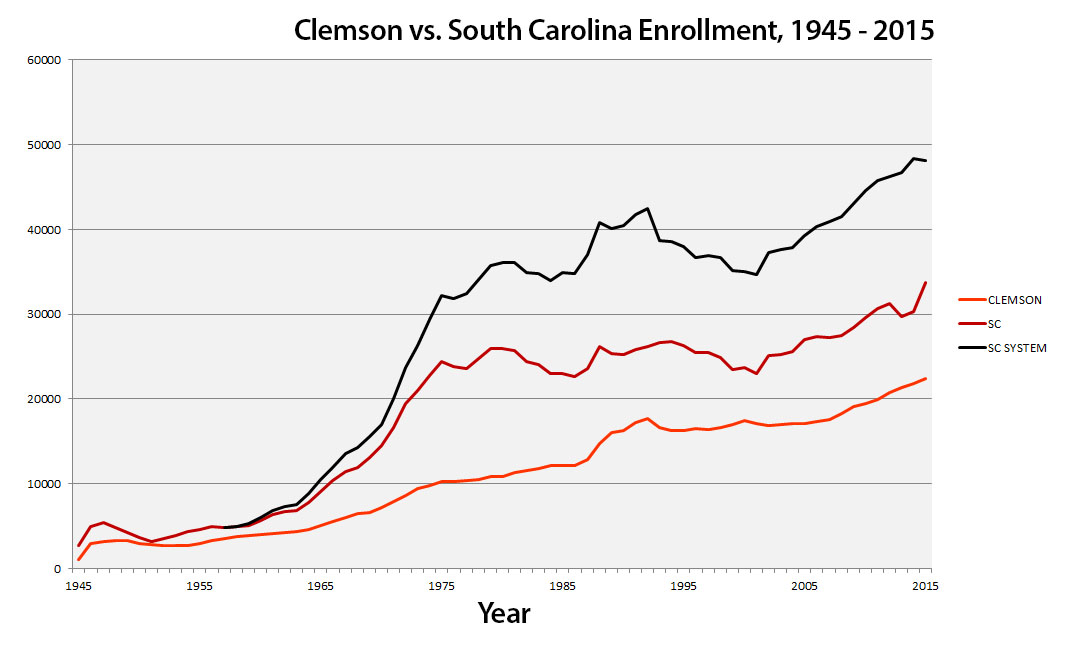
Clemson vs. USC Enrollment, 1945 – 2015

In the 1950s, the University of South Carolina expanded its reach across the state by establishing branch campuses under the auspices of the University of South Carolina System. Clemson, having obtained university status in 1964, established a branch campus in Sumter and formed a two-year transfer partnership with Greenville Technical College. House Speaker Sol Blatt was alarmed by the spread of Clemson and declared that South Carolina "should build as many two-year colleges over the state as rapidly as possible to prevent the expansion of Clemson schools for the Clemson people." Accordingly, the University of South Carolina began a new wave of expansion across the state and was aided by the fact that the Clemson Sumter extension suffered from low enrollment. In 1973, Sumter officials negotiated an agreement between USC and Clemson for the school to join the USC branch system.

In the past ten years, Clemson has experienced a larger percentage of enrollment growth over its rival school. Since 2005, Clemson University has grown by 30.5 percent compared to USC's 24.5 percent growth at its main Columbia campus and a 22.5 percent enrollment increase in the entire USC system. Both schools currently enroll more students than any time in their entire history.

== Football ==
Palmetto Bowl
- Clemson Tigers South Carolina Gamecocks
- First meeting: November 12, 1896; South Carolina, 12–6
- Latest meeting: November 29, 2025; Clemson, 28–14
- Next meeting: November 28, 2026
- Trophy: Hardee's Trophy (1980s–2014); Palmetto Trophy (2015–present)

Statistics
- Total meetings: 122
- All-time series: Clemson leads, 74–44–4
- Largest victory: Clemson, 51–0 (1900)
- Longest win streak: Clemson, 7 (1934–40 & 2014–2019) (2021)
- Current win streak: Clemson, 1 (2025–present)

The annual Clemson–South Carolina football game (sometimes dubbed the "Battle of the Palmetto State", unofficially called the "Palmetto Bowl" beginning in the 1950s, and known officially since 2014 as the "Palmetto Bowl", from the state's nickname) was the longest uninterrupted series in the South and the second longest uninterrupted NCAA DI-A/FBS series in the country. The streak came to an end in 2020 as the SEC announced their member teams would not play out of conference games due to the COVID-19 pandemic, thus cancelling the matchup vs. Clemson. The series dates back to 1896, and had been renewed every year since 1909 (111 consecutive games). The universities maintain college football stadiums in excess of 77,000 seats each, placing both in the top 18 largest college football stadiums in the United States. Although the series has been interrupted seven times since its inception, it ran uninterrupted from 1909 to 2019, making it the second-longest continuous rivalry in FBS Division I college football, after only Minnesota–Wisconsin, which has played uninterrupted since 1907. From 1896 to 1959, the Clemson–South Carolina game was played in Columbia and referred to as "Big Thursday". Since 1960, the game has alternated between both teams' home stadiums—South Carolina's Williams-Brice Stadium and Clemson's Memorial Stadium, usually as the regular season finale. Since 1962, the annual football game has been held in late November, usually on Thanksgiving weekend. Games in odd-numbered years are played in Columbia at South Carolina, and even-numbered years in Clemson at Clemson University.

Clemson holds a 74–44–4 lead in the series, a 45–31–2 lead in the modern era (post-WWII), and a 15–8 lead in the 21st century. Clemson's 74 wins against South Carolina is more than any other program has, and South Carolina's 44 wins against Clemson is tied for second with Georgia's 44 wins and behind Georgia Tech's 51 wins.

Every year, each school engages in a ritual involving the other team's mascot. South Carolina holds the "Tiger Burn", and Clemson holds a mock funeral for Cocky. After seven students—six from South Carolina and one from Clemson—died in the Ocean Isle Beach house fire in 2007, the Cocky funeral was cancelled and the Tiger Burn was changed to the "Tiger Tear Down" for that year.

The Palmetto Bowl is considered the most important sporting event in the state each season. It has also often been listed as one of the best rivalries in college football.

=== History and notable games ===
==== 1896: First matchup, start of Big Thursday ====
When Clemson began its football program in 1896, coached by Walter Riggs, they scheduled the rival Carolina "Jaguars" of South Carolina College for a Thursday morning game in conjunction with the State Fair. After having rode horse-drawn wagons to Furman earlier that season, Clemson instead took a train to Columbia. Roughly 2,000 fans paid 25 cents to watch the game, which was played at the fairgrounds. South Carolina won that game 12–6 and a new tradition was born – Big Thursday.

==== 1900: Largest margin of victory ====
In 1900, Clemson defeated South Carolina by a score of 51–0, still the largest margin of victory by either team in the series. It also marked Clemson's fourth consecutive win over South Carolina, having won in each of the last four years of the 19th century. This would be only the first of several winning streaks Clemson would have in the rivalry. However, the two schools would not play next year in 1901, the first of three pauses in the annual matchup.

==== 1902: Near riot, debut of "Gamecocks" and Tiger Burn ====
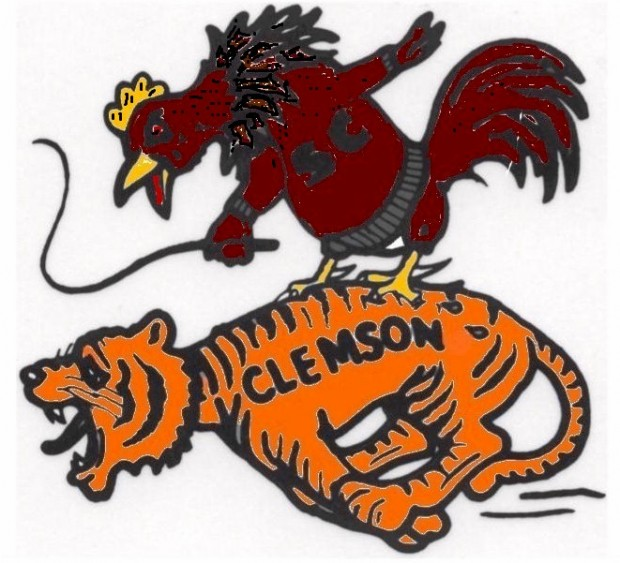

The Gamecock mascot made its first appearance in 1902. In that first season as the Gamecocks, South Carolina defeated a highly favored Clemson team coached by the legendary John Heisman by a score of 12–6, their first win over Clemson since 1896. However, it was the full-scale riot that nearly broke out in the wake of the game that is remembered most.

"The Carolina fans that week were carrying around a poster with the image of a tiger with a gamecock standing on top of it, holding the tiger's tail as if he was steering the tiger by the tail," Jay McCormick said. "Naturally, the Clemson guys didn't take too kindly to that, and on Wednesday and again on Thursday, there were sporadic fistfights involving brass knuckles and other objects and so forth, some of which resulted, according to the newspapers, in blood being spilled and persons having to seek medical assistance. After the game on Thursday, the Clemson guys frankly told the South Carolina students that if you bring this poster, which is insulting to us, to the big parade on Friday, you're going to be in trouble. And naturally, of course, the South Carolina students brought the poster to the parade. If you give someone an ultimatum and they are your rival, they're going to do exactly what you told them not to do."

As a result, 200–300 Clemson cadets marched on USC with rifles and bayonets, aiming to retrieve the sign. In response, forty South Carolina students, including future USC president J. Rion McKissick, armed themselves with knives and pistols to defend the campus and sign. Staff and police were able to defuse the situation, resulting in no shots being fired and no blood being spilled. They created a compromise to burn the sign between the two groups of students as they cheered at each other. The rivalry would also be suspended until 1909, out of concern for future violence. However, the year's events solidified the gamecock as the USC mascot and the burning of the poster began the tradition of the "Tiger Burn", which continues today.

==== 1909: Rivalry resumes, 111-year streak begins ====
In 1909, the rivalry resumed, with Big Thursday being played for the first time since 1902. Clemson won, 6–0. Additionally, there would be no further pauses in the rivalry until 2020. The game would now be played every year for 111 consecutive years, from 1909 to 2019. By the time it would be canceled again in 2020, Clemson–South Carolina would be the second-longest continuously played series in major college football.

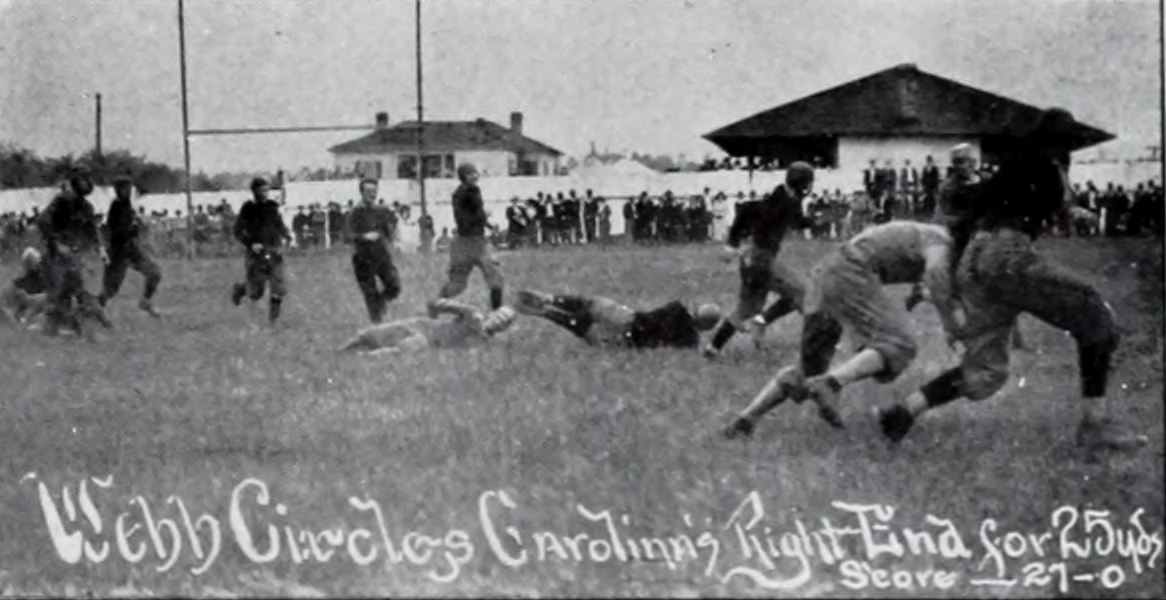
Action in the 1911 Clemson–USC football game

==== 1943: Officer trainee switches teams during wartime ====
World War II produced one of the most bizarre situations in the history of the rivalry. Cary Cox, a football player of the victorious Clemson squad in 1942, signed up for the V-12 program in 1943 and was placed at USC. The naval instructors at USC ordered him to play on the football team and he was named the captain for the Big Thursday game against Clemson. Cox was reluctant to play against his former teammates and he voiced his concerns to coach Lt. James P. Moran who responded, "Cox, I can't promise you'll get a Navy commission if you play Thursday, but I can damn well promise that you won't get one if you don't play." Cox then went out and led the South Carolina team to a 33–6 win against Clemson. He would return to Clemson after the war and captain the 1947 team in a losing effort to South Carolina, but Cox earned his place in history as the only player to captain both schools' football teams.

==== 1946: Near riot – counterfeit tickets ====
The 1946 game could be the most chaotic in the football series. Two New York mobsters printed counterfeit tickets for the game. Fans from both sides were denied entrance when the duplicate tickets were discovered, which led to a near riot. To add to the wild scene, a Clemson fan strangled a live chicken at midfield during halftime. Fans from both sides of the rivalry, many of whom who had been denied entrance, along with fans who poured out of the stands, stormed the fences and gates and spilled onto the field. It took U.S. Secretary of State James F. Byrnes, who attended the game along with then-Governor-elect Strom Thurmond, to settle down the hostile crowd. Once order was restored, fans were allowed to stand along the sidelines, with the teams, while the second half was played to the game's conclusion. The Gamecocks eventually won by a score of 26–14.

==== 1952: Game mandated by South Carolina law, new conference formed ====
Several factors led to the creation of the ACC, including the 1952 Clemson–Carolina game

The Southern Conference (SoCon) almost brought the longstanding rivalry to an abrupt end when it ordered Clemson to play no other league team other than Maryland as punishment for both schools accepting bowl bids against conference rules; both Clemson and USC were members at the time. Upon request of both schools' presidents, the South Carolina General Assembly passed a resolution on February 27, 1952, ordering the game to be played. The Gamecocks won the contest 6–0. The SoCon reacted to the game by attempting to suspend Clemson, leading seven member schools, including Clemson and USC, to leave the league and form the Atlantic Coast Conference in May 1953.

==== 1959: Final Big Thursday ====
For 64 years, Clemson traveled to Columbia to face the Gamecocks for the annual Big Thursday rivalry. This year would mark the last year of the tradition as the rivalry progressed to a home-and-home series played on a Saturday starting in 1960. Big Thursday had received criticism for causing less interest in American football in the state after it was played every year. Clemson head coach Frank Howard also explained: "We always had to sit in the sun, and we got tired of going down there every year. We weren’t getting half of the tickets, half of the program and concession sales, and it knocked one game out of our schedule because we could not play the Saturday before or the Saturday after the Thursday game". Against unranked South Carolina, No. 17 Clemson won the final Big Thursday match-up 27–0. After the game, Howard was photographed looking out over Carolina Stadium and blowing a kiss, symbolizing Clemson and Howard finally kissing Big Thursday goodbye. This image is considered one of the more iconic images in the history of the rivalry. However, the two schools would not move the contest to the last regular season game until two years later.

==== 1960: First game played in Clemson and on Saturday, state and town records broken ====
On November 12, 1960, Clemson played South Carolina at home for the first time in history. Additionally, the game was played on a day other than Thursday (Saturday) for the first time ever. It was reportedly "the largest crowd to see an athletic event" in the state and "the greatest number of automobiles ever driven" to Clemson, until then. In what was called a "defensive duel" in front of a record crowd of 45,000, Clemson won the matchup 12–2. From here on out, the two schools would continue to alternate hosting the game.

==== 1961: "The Prank" ====
In 1961, a few minutes before Clemson football players entered the field for pre-game warm ups, a group of USC Sigma Nu fraternity members ran onto the field, jumping up and down and cheering in football uniforms that resembled the ones worn by the Tigers. This caused the Clemson band to start playing "Tiger Rag," which was followed by the pranksters falling down as they attempted to do calisthenics. They would also do football drills where guys would drop passes and miss the ball when trying to kick it. Clemson fans quickly realized that they had been tricked, and some of them angrily ran onto the field. However, security restored order before any blows could be exchanged. The South Carolina frat boys had also acquired a sickly cow they planned to bring out during halftime to be the "Clemson Homecoming Queen", but the cow died en route to the stadium. South Carolina won the game 21–14.

==== 1963: Postponed due to national tragedy ====
On November 22, 1963, just over an hour after the Tigers’ buses departed for Columbia, President John F. Kennedy was assassinated. The team arrived in Batesburg for a practice, and received the news from the hotel staff. Both schools planned to proceed with the original day and time (the next day, November 23), which was going to be just the second regular-season game televised in Clemson history. However, as the evening continued, more and more schools across the shocked nation announced postponements or cancellations of their games. At 10:00 pm, Clemson and South Carolina released a joint statement, saying their game would be pushed back to November 28, Thanksgiving Day. Clemson won the game 24–20. However, it was not televised on CBS as originally planned.

==== 1971: First game with African-American players on both teams, no longer conference opponents, state record broken ====
In 1970, both football programs had at least one African-American player. However, Marion Reeves, Clemson's first African-American football player, was a freshman in 1970 and thus was not eligible to play in the rivalry game, or any game. In the 1971 rivalry game, Carlton Haywood and Jackie Brown were both starters for South Carolina, while Reeves (now an eligible player) came off the bench as a sophomore and recorded two interceptions. Thus, the 1971 Clemson–South Carolina game was the first in the series in which African-American players played for both teams. Additionally, South Carolina left the ACC after the 1970 season, making the 1971 matchup the first in the series since 1921 to be a non-conference game, which it remains today. The game was played in front of a crowd of 57,242 at Carolina Stadium, reportedly "the largest ever to see a football game in South Carolina" until then. Clemson won 17–7, their first victory over the Gamecocks since 1967.

==== 1975: Most points scored by South Carolina ====
On November 22, 1975, South Carolina defeated Clemson 56–20. This remains Carolina's largest margin of victory ever against the Tigers.

==== 1977: "The Catch" ====
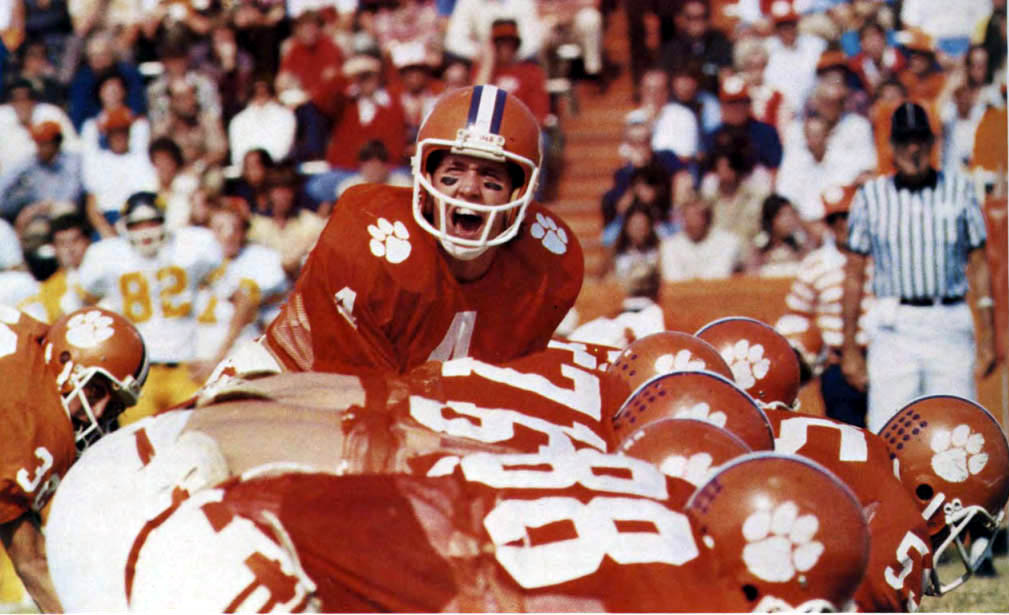
Clemson's offense in 1977

In 1977, No. 15 Clemson started the game 24–0, in Columbia. However, South Carolina then scored the next 27 unanswered points to make it a 27–24 game, with 1:48 left in the fourth quarter. South Carolina receiver Phil Logan even began revealing to the crowd a t-shirt which read "No Cigars Today" in reference to Clemson's new tradition of cigar celebrations that season. With 49 seconds left, Clemson WR Jerry Butler made a 20-yard touchdown reception on a pass from QB Steve Fuller to give Clemson the 31–27 victory. The official athletic site of the Clemson Tigers has described the reception as "a leaping, twisting catch that no one else could have made in that game, and no one else has made since". This play is known as "The Catch" and is seen as one of the most memorable plays in the rivalry. In 2019, ESPN would select the 1977 Clemson–South Carolina game as the 112th greatest game in college football history.

==== 1980: Orange britches ====
In the last regular season game for the 1980 season, a heavily favored South Carolina team (ranked No. 14, with eventual Heisman Trophy winner George Rogers) traveled to Death Valley to take on the Tigers. In a surprise to both the players and the fans, Coach Danny Ford unveiled new orange uniform pants for the Tigers to wear. This was the first time in Clemson's history that they wore orange pants in any combination for a football game. Inspired by the pants, the underdog Tigers defeated the Gamecocks, 27–6. The win over the Gamecocks in 1980 would lift Clemson to its national championship run in 1981, and Clemson would go on to post a 16–2 record under Ford when wearing orange pants. To this day, Clemson only wears orange pants when a division championship, state championship, conference championship, playoff game or national championship is on the line.

==== 1981: Clemson wins their first national championship ====
In 1981, Clemson defeated South Carolina 29–13 en route to their first national championship.

==== 1984: Black magic ====
South Carolina took their 9–1 record on the road to Clemson, and fell behind 21–3 to the Tigers. With about three minutes remaining in the game, Gamecock QB Mike Hold led an eight-play 86-yard touchdown drive and, thanks to a Clemson penalty that allowed a re-kick of a missed extra point, defeated the Tigers 22–21 to finish the first 10-win season in program history.

==== 1987: Highest-ranked matchup until 2013 ====
In one of the last seasons for both head coaches, Joe Morrison and Danny Ford, No. 12 South Carolina defeated No. 8 Clemson at home by a score of 20–7. It was the highest-ranked matchup in the rivalry's history until then, and would remain so until 2013.

==== 1989: Orange on the road and Ford's last hurrah ====
After suffering two disappointing upsets to Duke and Georgia Tech, the 8–2 Tigers traveled to Columbia for the annual game. Danny Ford allowed the Clemson players to wear orange pants on the road for the first time. Led by halfback Terry Allen's 97-yard, two-touchdown first half, the Tigers rolled the Gamecocks on the ground for 355 yards en route to a 45–0 victory. The game would be Ford's last against South Carolina as Clemson's coach. He finished with a 7–3–1 record against the Gamecocks.

==== 1992: Signing the paw ====
After an 0–5 start to begin the 1992 season (USC's first in the SEC), freshman sensation Steve Taneyhill led South Carolina to four wins in his first five starts as Gamecock quarterback. With Clemson needing a win at home to become bowl-eligible, Taneyhill led his team to a 24–13 victory and famously signed his name with his finger on the Tiger Paw at midfield following a key second-half touchdown.

==== 1994: "The Return" ====
With both teams entering the game 5–5 and trying to become bowl-eligible, South Carolina led 14–7 at the half in Clemson. Gamecock RB Brandon Bennett received the kick to start the third quarter, took a few steps, then turned and threw a backward pass to the other side of the field which was caught by DB Reggie Richardson who returned the ball 85 yards to the Tigers' 6-yard line. Bennett ran it in for a touchdown on the next play, putting South Carolina ahead 21–7 and the Gamecocks never looked back, going on to win the game 33–7 and clinching a bid to the Carquest Bowl.

==== 2000: "The Catch II"/"The Push-off" ====
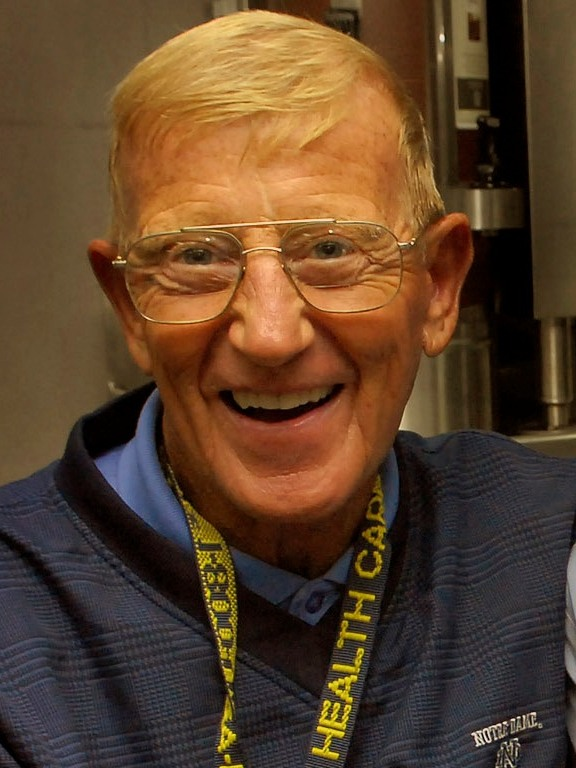
Hall of Famer Lou Holtz coached in multiple infamous games in the rivalry, including the controversy in 2000, the blowout in 2003, and the brawl in 2004

In 2000, for the first time since 1987, both teams were ranked entering the game. Trailing late in the game 14–13, Clemson quarterback Woody Dantzler connected with wide-receiver Rod Gardner for a 50-yard reception to South Carolina's 8-yard line with ten seconds remaining.South Carolina players and fans point to a replay that shows Gardner pushing off Gamecock defender Andre Goodman, while Clemson players and fans contend that the contact was mutual and incidental. No penalty flag was thrown on the play despite a Gamecock receiver being flagged for offensive pass interference on a similar play in the first half by the same official. Clemson kicker Aaron Hunt kicked a 25-yard field goal that gave Clemson a 16–14 win. The game remains divisive, with Clemson fans remembering it as "The Catch II" and South Carolina fans remembering it as "The Push-Off Game".

==== 2001: A bicentennial win ====
In the 200th year of the University of South Carolina, the Gamecocks hosted the Tigers at the end of a successful regular season that saw them ranked in the Top 25 every week and 7–3 heading into the rivalry game. South Carolina jumped out to an early 20–9 lead behind a strong ground attack, and held on to win 20–15 and secure a bid to their second straight Outback Bowl. With the win, South Carolina reached eight wins in consecutive seasons for the first time since 1987–88. Because of the September 11 attacks, this was not the final regular season game for Clemson. The Tigers rescheduled their September 15 game (versus Duke) for the first weekend of December.

==== 2003: Most points scored ====
In 2003, in Columbia, with both Tommy Bowden's and Lou Holtz's jobs on the line, Clemson defeated South Carolina by a score of 63–17. This blowout set individual-game records for the series: points scored by a team (63) as well as total points scored by both teams (80). Clemson quarterback Charlie Whitehurst tied the school record with four touchdown passes. South Carolina finished the season 5–7, and this would be their last losing season until 2015. Both coaches would end up being retained.

==== 2004: "The Brawl" ====
In 2004, at home, the Tigers did their tradition of running down The Hill, where some Gamecocks waited for them at the bottom and began to shove and yell at them. The game continued on as normal until the fourth quarter when several South Carolina offensive linemen shoved a Clemson defensive end, beginning a brawl between both teams that lasted several minutes. Clemson won the game 29–7. Each team had won a total of six games that year, making them technically bowl eligible. However, both schools withdrew from bowl consideration because of the unsportsmanlike nature of the fight. Additionally, the SEC and ACC suspended six players from both South Carolina and Clemson for one game. This was also the last game ever coached by Hall of Famer Lou Holtz, having retired shortly thereafter.

==== 2005: A quarterback wins 4 ====
In 2005, the two teams showed an unusual gesture of sportsmanship by meeting at midfield before the game to shake hands, putting the melee of 2004 behind them. Clemson won this game 13–9, leaving the Tigers' quarterback, Charlie Whitehurst, undefeated against USC in his four years at Clemson. He remains the only quarterback on either side in the history of the rivalry to go 4–0 against his archrival. The best record against Clemson for a South Carolina quarterback belongs to Tommy Suggs, who led the Gamecocks to three victories in a row from 1968 to 1970.

==== 2006: Kickers make the difference ====
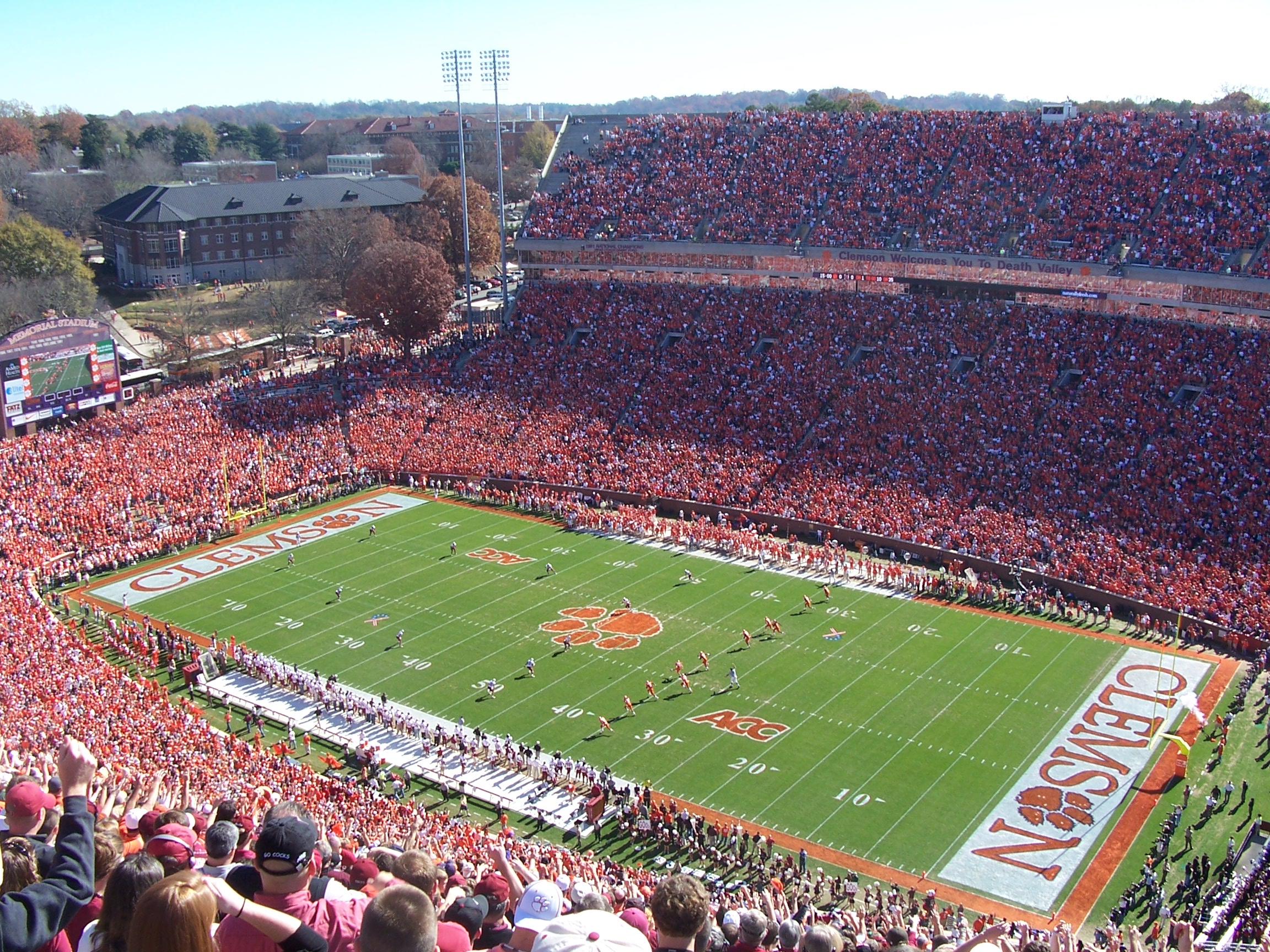
Clemson kicking off to South Carolina on November 25, 2006

In 2006, at home, Clemson was leading 28–14 in the third quarter, with South Carolina quarterback Blake Mitchell throwing three interceptions. The Gamecocks then scored 17 unanswered points, including two Mike Davis touchdown runs and a 35-yard field goal from Ryan Succop – the only points in the fourth quarter – to give the Gamecocks a 31–28 lead. Clemson kicker Jad Dean missed a field goal attempt wide left as time expired to give South Carolina the upset win, their first win against Clemson since 2001. This game also marked the moving of the series to the Saturday following Thanksgiving Day.

==== 2011: First ranked matchup in a decade ====
In terms of highly-ranked matchups, the rivalry reached its peak in the early 2010s, with both teams being ranked in the 2011, 2012, and 2013 games, and each of those games being more highly-ranked than the last.

The game that kickstarted this era was in 2011. It was the first game in which both teams were ranked since 2000, and was the most highly ranked matchup since 1987. Additionally, the 2011 matchup broke the record for combined wins between both teams, with eighteen. South Carolina was ranked No. 14 with a 9–2 record, while Clemson was ranked No. 18 with a 9–2 record. At home, South Carolina defeated Clemson with a final score of 34–13. With the victory, South Carolina tied the school record for most wins in a season.

==== 2012: Second top-15 matchup ====
In 2012, both teams were ranked inside the top fifteen for only the second time ever, and the first since 1987. Additionally, the 2012 matchup broke last season's record for combined wins between both teams, with nineteen. Clemson was ranked No. 12 with a 10–1 record, while South Carolina was ranked No. 13 with a 9–2 record. Clemson was a 4-point favorite at home. The Tigers were considered to have an explosive offense, but hadn't yet been tested against a defense like the Gamecocks, who ranked thirteenth nationally. Led by sophomore backup quarterback Dylan Thompson, South Carolina defeated Clemson with a final score of 27–17. South Carolina star defensive end Jadeveon Clowney registered 4.5 sacks, setting the school single-season record with thirteen sacks. It was the Gamecocks' fourth consecutive victory over the Tigers, tying the school record for most consecutive wins over Clemson, having last won four in a row in 1951–54. With his 65th victory, South Carolina head coach Steve Spurrier became the winningest head coach in program history, surpassing Rex Enright.

==== 2013: Highest-ranked meeting ====
In the highest-ever ranked matchup between the two teams (No. 6 Clemson playing at No. 10 South Carolina), the Gamecocks secured their fifth straight victory over the Tigers with a score of 31–17. South Carolina took advantage of six turnovers by Clemson, including two during punt returns, to secure the victory. The win marked the Gamecocks' longest streak versus Clemson in the rivalry's history. With the win, South Carolina quarterback Connor Shaw finished his college career unbeaten at Williams-Brice Stadium.

==== 2014: Clemson breaks and begins streak in first "Palmetto Bowl" ====
Two days before the 2014 game, the annual Clemson-South Carolina football matchup was officially named the "Palmetto Bowl" by both schools, after years of the name existing unofficially. Going into the game that year, South Carolina had won five straight and six of the last eight matchups against the Tigers. However, behind the efforts of dynamic young players and the top-ranked defense in the country, Clemson won with a final score of 35–17. Clemson freshman quarterback Deshaun Watson, playing on a torn ACL, threw for 269 yards and ran for two touchdowns. With promising young talent, it was predicted by some media and players that Clemson might then be able to start its own streak in the rivalry, and they did, not losing to South Carolina again until 2022.

==== 2020: Game canceled ====
Due to the COVID-19 outbreak, the SEC announced that no out-of-conference games would be played among its members, thus canceling the 2020 matchup between Clemson and South Carolina originally scheduled for November 28, 2020. The decision marked the first time the two teams would not play in over 100 years.

==== 2024: Both Teams Ranked with Playoff Hopes ====
In 2024, the two teams met in Memorial Stadium for the first match up with both teams ranked since 2013 – South Carolina was ranked No. 16 in the AP Poll and no. 15 in the CFP poll, and Clemson was ranked No. 12 in both. Clemson entered the game coming off three straight wins, and the Gamecocks came in having won five straight games. For South Carolina, winning would keep alive hopes for potentially going to the 12-team College Football Playoff with an at-large bid, whereas for Clemson a loss would more than likely keep them from gaining an at-large bid and force them to qualify via a less likely ACC Championship Game berth and victory. Clemson led 14–7 into the fourth quarter, but South Carolina scored the final 10 points, with freshman quarterback LaNorris Sellers rushing for the game-winning touchdown on a 3rd down and 16 with just over a minute left. Clemson drove deep into South Carolina territory for a potential tying or winning score on the ensuing drive, but a diving interception sealed the 17–14 win for the Gamecocks in the final seconds. Afterward and conversely to the stakes of the game, Clemson was included in College Football Playoff via the ACC championship route, whereas South Carolina was left out. Clemson subsequently lost in the first round of the playoffs to the Texas Longhorns.

=== Game results ===
Clemson victories	South Carolina victories	Tie games

No.	Date	Location	Winning team		Losing team	
1	November 12, 1896	Columbia, SC	South Carolina	12	Clemson	6
2	November 10, 1897	Columbia, SC	Clemson	20	South Carolina	6
3	November 17, 1898	Columbia, SC	Clemson	24	South Carolina	0
4	November 9, 1899	Columbia, SC	Clemson	34	South Carolina	0
5	November 1, 1900	Columbia, SC	Clemson	51	South Carolina	0
6	October 30, 1902	Columbia, SC	South Carolina	12	Clemson	6
7	November 4, 1909	Columbia, SC	Clemson	6	South Carolina	0
8	November 3, 1910	Columbia, SC	Clemson	24	South Carolina	0
9	November 2, 1911	Columbia, SC	Clemson	27	South Carolina	0
10	October 31, 1912	Columbia, SC	South Carolina	22	Clemson	7
11	October 30, 1913	Columbia, SC	Clemson	32	South Carolina	0
12	October 29, 1914	Columbia, SC	Clemson	29	South Carolina	6
13	October 28, 1915	Columbia, SC	Tie	0	Tie	0
14	October 26, 1916	Columbia, SC	Clemson	27	South Carolina	0
15	October 25, 1917	Columbia, SC	Clemson	21	South Carolina	13
16	November 2, 1918	Columbia, SC	Clemson	39	South Carolina	0
17	October 30, 1919	Columbia, SC	Clemson	19	South Carolina	6
18	October 28, 1920	Columbia, SC	South Carolina	3	Clemson	0
19	October 27, 1921	Columbia, SC	South Carolina	21	Clemson	0
20	October 26, 1922	Columbia, SC	Clemson	3	South Carolina	0
21	October 25, 1923	Columbia, SC	Clemson	7	South Carolina	6
22	October 23, 1924	Columbia, SC	South Carolina	3	Clemson	0
23	October 22, 1925	Columbia, SC	South Carolina	33	Clemson	0
24	October 21, 1926	Columbia, SC	South Carolina	24	Clemson	0
25	October 20, 1927	Columbia, SC	Clemson	20	South Carolina	0
26	October 25, 1928	Columbia, SC	Clemson	32	South Carolina	0
27	October 24, 1929	Columbia, SC	Clemson	21	South Carolina	14
28	October 23, 1930	Columbia, SC	Clemson	20	South Carolina	7
29	October 22, 1931	Columbia, SC	South Carolina	21	Clemson	0
30	October 20, 1932	Columbia, SC	South Carolina	14	Clemson	0
31	October 19, 1933	Columbia, SC	South Carolina	7	Clemson	0
32	October 25, 1934	Columbia, SC	Clemson	19	South Carolina	0
33	October 24, 1935	Columbia, SC	Clemson	44	South Carolina	0
34	October 22, 1936	Columbia, SC	Clemson	19	South Carolina	0
35	October 21, 1937	Columbia, SC	Clemson	34	South Carolina	6
36	October 20, 1938	Columbia, SC	Clemson	34	South Carolina	12
37	October 19, 1939	Columbia, SC	Clemson	27	South Carolina	0
38	October 24, 1940	Columbia, SC	No. 13 Clemson	21	South Carolina	13
39	October 23, 1941	Columbia, SC	South Carolina	18	No. 14 Clemson	14
40	October 22, 1942	Columbia, SC	Clemson	18	South Carolina	6
41	October 21, 1943	Columbia, SC	South Carolina	33	Clemson	6
42	October 19, 1944	Columbia, SC	Clemson	20	South Carolina	13
43	October 25, 1945	Columbia, SC	Tie	0	Tie	0
44	October 24, 1946	Columbia, SC	South Carolina	26	Clemson	14
45	October 23, 1947	Columbia, SC	South Carolina	21	Clemson	19
46	October 21, 1948	Columbia, SC	No. 14 Clemson	13	South Carolina	7
47	October 20, 1949	Columbia, SC	South Carolina	27	Clemson	13
48	October 19, 1950	Columbia, SC	Tie	14	Tie	14
49	October 25, 1951	Columbia, SC	South Carolina	20	Clemson	0
50	October 23, 1952	Columbia, SC	South Carolina	6	Clemson	0
51	October 22, 1953	Columbia, SC	South Carolina	14	Clemson	7
52	October 21, 1954	Columbia, SC	South Carolina	13	Clemson	8
53	October 20, 1955	Columbia, SC	Clemson	28	South Carolina	14
54	October 25, 1956	Columbia, SC	No. 20 Clemson	7	South Carolina	0
55	October 24, 1957	Columbia, SC	Clemson	13	South Carolina	0
56	October 23, 1958	Columbia, SC	South Carolina	26	No. 10 Clemson	6
57	October 22, 1959	Columbia, SC	No. 17 Clemson	27	South Carolina	0
58	November 12, 1960	Clemson, SC	Clemson	12	South Carolina	2
59	November 11, 1961	Columbia, SC	South Carolina	21	Clemson	14
60	November 24, 1962	Clemson, SC	Clemson	20	South Carolina	17
61	November 28, 1963	Columbia, SC	Clemson	24	South Carolina	20
62	November 21, 1964	Clemson, SC	South Carolina	7	Clemson	3

No.	Date	Location	Winning team		Losing team	
63	November 20, 1965	Columbia, SC	South Carolina	17	Clemson	16
64	November 26, 1966	Clemson, SC	Clemson	35	South Carolina	10
65	November 25, 1967	Columbia, SC	Clemson	23	South Carolina	12
66	November 23, 1968	Clemson, SC	South Carolina	7	Clemson	3
67	November 22, 1969	Columbia, SC	South Carolina	27	Clemson	13
68	November 21, 1970	Clemson, SC	South Carolina	38	Clemson	32
69	November 27, 1971	Columbia, SC	Clemson	17	South Carolina	7
70	November 25, 1972	Clemson, SC	Clemson	7	South Carolina	6
71	November 24, 1973	Columbia, SC	South Carolina	32	Clemson	20
72	November 23, 1974	Clemson, SC	Clemson	39	South Carolina	21
73	November 22, 1975	Columbia, SC	South Carolina	56	Clemson	20
74	November 20, 1976	Clemson, SC	Clemson	28	South Carolina	9
75	November 19, 1977	Columbia, SC	No. 15 Clemson	31	South Carolina	27
76	November 25, 1978	Clemson, SC	No. 10 Clemson	41	South Carolina	23
77	November 24, 1979	Columbia, SC	No. 19 South Carolina	13	No. 13 Clemson	9
78	November 22, 1980	Clemson, SC	Clemson	27	No. 14 South Carolina	6
79	November 21, 1981	Columbia, SC	No. 2 Clemson	29	South Carolina	13
80	November 20, 1982	Clemson, SC	No. 10 Clemson	24	South Carolina	6
81	November 19, 1983	Columbia, SC	No. 13 Clemson	22	South Carolina	13
82	November 24, 1984	Clemson, SC	No. 9 South Carolina	22	Clemson	21
83	November 23, 1985	Columbia, SC	Clemson	24	South Carolina	17
84	November 22, 1986	Clemson, SC	Tie	21	Tie	21
85	November 21, 1987	Columbia, SC	No. 12 South Carolina	20	No. 8 Clemson	7
86	November 19, 1988	Clemson, SC	No. 15 Clemson	29	South Carolina	10
87	November 18, 1989	Columbia, SC	No. 15 Clemson	45	South Carolina	0
88	November 17, 1990	Clemson, SC	No. 17 Clemson	24	South Carolina	15
89	November 23, 1991	Columbia, SC	No. 14 Clemson	41	South Carolina	24
90	November 21, 1992	Clemson, SC	South Carolina	24	Clemson	13
91	November 20, 1993	Columbia, SC	No. 24 Clemson	16	South Carolina	13
92	November 19, 1994	Clemson, SC	South Carolina	33	Clemson	7
93	November 18, 1995	Columbia, SC	No. 24 Clemson	38	South Carolina	17
94	November 23, 1996	Clemson, SC	South Carolina	34	No. 22 Clemson	31
95	November 22, 1997	Columbia, SC	Clemson	47	South Carolina	21
96	November 21, 1998	Clemson, SC	Clemson	28	South Carolina	19
97	November 20, 1999	Columbia, SC	Clemson	31	South Carolina	21
98	November 18, 2000	Clemson, SC	No. 16 Clemson	16	No. 25 South Carolina	14
99	November 17, 2001	Columbia, SC	No. 22 South Carolina	20	Clemson	15
100	November 23, 2002	Clemson, SC	Clemson	27	South Carolina	20
101	November 22, 2003	Columbia, SC	Clemson	63	South Carolina	17
102	November 20, 2004	Clemson, SC	Clemson	29	South Carolina	7
103	November 19, 2005	Columbia, SC	Clemson	13	No. 19 South Carolina	9
104	November 25, 2006	Clemson, SC	South Carolina	31	No. 24 Clemson	28
105	November 24, 2007	Columbia, SC	No. 21 Clemson	23	South Carolina	21
106	November 29, 2008	Clemson, SC	Clemson	31	South Carolina	14
107	November 28, 2009	Columbia, SC	South Carolina	34	No. 15 Clemson	17
108	November 27, 2010	Clemson, SC	No. 18 South Carolina	29	Clemson	7
109	November 26, 2011	Columbia, SC	No. 14 South Carolina	34	No. 18 Clemson	13
110	November 24, 2012	Clemson, SC	No. 13 South Carolina	27	No. 12 Clemson	17
111	November 30, 2013	Columbia, SC	No. 10 South Carolina	31	No. 6 Clemson	17
112	November 29, 2014	Clemson, SC	No. 23 Clemson	35	South Carolina	17
113	November 28, 2015	Columbia, SC	No. 1 Clemson	37	South Carolina	32
114	November 26, 2016	Clemson, SC	No. 4 Clemson	56	South Carolina	7
115	November 25, 2017	Columbia, SC	No. 4 Clemson	34	South Carolina	10
116	November 24, 2018	Clemson, SC	No. 2 Clemson	56	South Carolina	35
117	November 30, 2019	Columbia, SC	No. 3 Clemson	38	South Carolina	3
118	November 27, 2021	Columbia, SC	No. 23 Clemson	30	South Carolina	0
119	November 26, 2022	Clemson, SC	South Carolina	31	No. 8 Clemson	30
120	November 25, 2023	Columbia, SC	No. 24 Clemson	16	South Carolina	7
121	November 30, 2024	Clemson, SC	No. 15 South Carolina	17	No. 12 Clemson	14
122	November 29, 2025	Columbia, SC	Clemson	28	South Carolina	14
Series: Clemson leads 74–44–4
The game scheduled for November 28, 2020 was cancelled by the Southeastern Conference's modified season due to COVID-19 precautions.

== Baseball ==
In baseball, Clemson leads the series overall 191–145–2. The teams previously met four times during the regular season, with two games scheduled at each home field. Two of the games were played on Saturday and Sunday, and then later in the season 2 games were played during the mid-week, usually on Wednesday. Since 2010, the teams have competed against each other over the course of a single weekend: once on each home field and once at a neutral site. Fluor Field (2010, 2011, 2013–2018, 2019–present in odd-numbered years) in Greenville, SC, Segra Park (2019–present in even-numbered years) in Columbia, SC, and Riley Park (2012) in Charleston, SC have served as the host sites. The other instances where the teams met in neutral site games were the 2002 College World Series and the 2010 College World Series, both times at Rosenblatt Stadium in Omaha, NE.

Both schools are perennially considered to be among the top programs in the country, giving the rivalry a prominent spot in college baseball beyond the state of South Carolina. SEBaseball.com's Mark Etheridge has called it "college baseball's most heated rivalry," and Baseball America's Aaron Fitt has called it "far and away the most compelling rivalry college baseball has to offer."

=== Recent series ===
2025 Series					All-Time Series
Date	Location	Winner	Score	Attendance	All-Time Series
February 27, 2026	Founders Park • Columbia, SC	South Carolina	7–0	8,242	Clemson; 193–146–2
February 28, 2026	Segra Park • Columbia, SC	Clemson	4–1	8,480	Clemson; 193–146–2
March 1, 2026	Doug Kingsmore Stadium • Clemson, SC	Clemson	7–2	6,678	Clemson; 193–146–2

=== College World Series in the 21st century ===
The rivalry has taken a deeper hold in the 2000s and 2010s, as twice in the century the two teams battled, coincidentally in the semi-finals both times, with the Tigers being 2–0 and needing only one win to advance to the championship, and the Gamecocks losing the first game and having to win twice to reach the finals out of the double elimination repechage round in both situations. The Gamecocks proceeded to win out and reach the finals in both years.

2002
Leading up to the 2002 semi-finals, Clemson had already won three out of four regular season games against South Carolina. The Gamecocks beat their rivals soundly, 12–4, and then beat the Tigers again, 10–2, the following day to advance to the national championship game. The Gamecocks fell to Texas 12–6 in the championship game, the last under the format where a one-game final was played.

2010
Eight years later, in what has been called The Last Bat at Rosenblatt, an identical situation leading to the series began. Clemson had taken both on-campus games from South Carolina in the regular season, including a lopsided 19–6 victory in the rubber match, played before over 8,000 fans at Carolina Stadium in Columbia, but had lost in the "neutral site" game. The Gamecocks had just come off a 12-inning win against the Oklahoma Sooners less than 24 hours before, while the Tigers had two days of rest. However, fatigue was not a factor as the Gamecocks won the first game, 5–1, on a dominating complete game pitching performance by reliever Michael Roth, who had not started a game in more than a year. South Carolina won the second game the following day, 4–3, to advance to the championship series against UCLA, who they defeated, 7–1 (Game 1) and 2–1 (Game 2) to win the NCAA Division I Baseball Championship. South Carolina went on to win the National Championship again against Florida in 2011 and lost to Arizona in the finals in 2012. Clemson, on the other hand, would not advance pass the regionals since the loss until the 2024 season.

== Other varsity sports ==
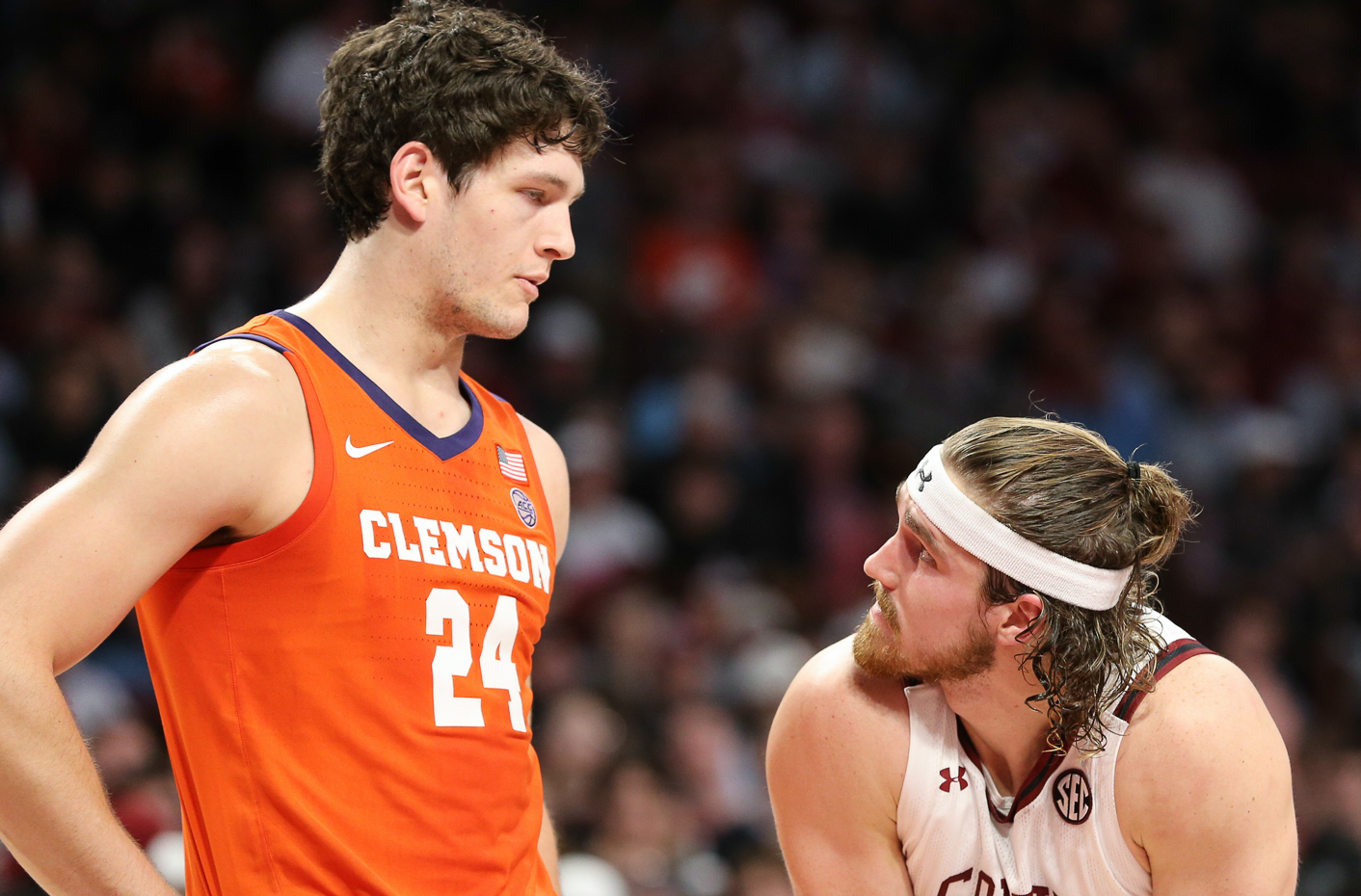
Moment during a basketball game in 2022

=== Men's teams ===
Sport	Last Matchup					All-Time Series	
Sport	Date	Location	Winner	Score	Attendance	Leader	Record
Basketball	December 16, 2025	Littlejohn Coliseum; Clemson, South Carolina	Clemson	68–61	9,000	South Carolina	93–82
Soccer	August 28, 2026	Eugene E. Stone III Stadium; Columbia, South Carolina	South Carolina	3–2	7,671	Clemson	35–18–2
Tennis	January 22, 2026	Carolina Tennis Center; Columbia, South Carolina	Clemson	4–2		South Carolina	71–42–2

=== Women's teams ===
Sport	Last Matchup / Series					All-Time Series	
Sport	Date	Location	Winner	Score	Attendance	Leader	Record
Basketball	November 12, 2026	Littlejohn Coliseum; Clemson, South Carolina	South Carolina	65-44	5,629	South Carolina	38–33
Soccer	August 20, 2026	Eugene E. Stone III Stadium; Columbia, South Carolina	South Carolina	1–0	5,659	Clemson	16–12–5
Softball	March 25, 2026	Beckham Field; Columbia, South Carolina	Clemson	8–0 (6)	1,647	Clemson	8–3
Softball	April 14, 2026	McWhorter Stadium; Clemson, South Carolina	South Carolina	3–1	2,034	Clemson	8–3
Tennis	February 10, 2026	Carolina Tennis Center; Columbia, South Carolina	South Carolina	3–4		South Carolina	33–29
Volleyball	August 31, 2025	Jervey Athletic Center; Clemson, South Carolina	Clemson	3–2		South Carolina	45–24

=== Discontinued sports ===
Sport	Final Matchup					All-Time Series
Sport	Date	Location	Winner	Score	Leader	Record
Men's Swimming & Diving	October 29, 2011	Westside Aquatic Center; Greenville, South Carolina	South Carolina	162–137	South Carolina	35–13
Women's Swimming & Diving	October 29, 2011	Westside Aquatic Center; Greenville, South Carolina	South Carolina	191–108	South Carolina	22–14
Women's Diving	November 9, 2016	McHugh Natatorium; Clemson, South Carolina	South Carolina	28–10	South Carolina	4–1

- Clemson discontinued men's swimming & diving and women's swimming after the 2011–2012 season.
- Clemson sponsored women's diving as a standalone sport from the 2012–2013 season until the 2016–2017 season, when it was discontinued.

== Blood drive ==
The rivalry extends beyond sports to the annual blood drive between the two schools, also known as the "Blood Bowl" or the "Blood Battle". Students, faculty and fans from the schools band together in an effort to collect blood at the start of the holiday season when blood donations typically decrease. The drive is held on both campuses the week before the football matchup. The University of South Carolina and Clemson University wrapped up their 41st annual blood drive in 2025, resulting in a seventh consecutive win for Clemson. Currently, Clemson holds a 22–18 advantage in the yearly competition.

The blood drive is sponsored by The Blood Connection and American Red Cross at both universities. At the University of South Carolina, it is organized by the Carolina-Clemson Blood Drive Committee, the school's second-largest student-run organization. At Clemson University, it is organized by the Gamma Lambda chapter of the Alpha Phi Omega national service fraternity. All donors receive various rewards, such as a sweatshirt, t-shirt, gift card, chance to win prizes, local discount or food.

It is one of the largest collegiate blood drives in the country and "one of the most successful blood drives ever initiated". The Blood Bowl has collected more than 120,000–180,000 pints of blood, saved more than 141,000 lives, and impacted more than 500,000 lives.

== Palmetto Series ==
On August 4, 2015, leaders from the South Carolina Department of Agriculture, Clemson University, and the University of South Carolina gathered at the South Carolina State House to announce the launch of the Certified SC Grown Palmetto Series, in which the Tigers and Gamecocks would compete for the Palmetto Series trophy based primarily on head-to-head athletic competition. The Palmetto Series is comparable to other all-sport college rivalry series in the country, such as the Crosstown Cup, Bedlam Series, and Territorial Cup Series. It has been described as a "state championship".

As of 2024–25, the following twelve sports count toward the series: baseball, men's basketball, women's basketball, women's cross country, football, women's golf, men's soccer, women's soccer, softball, men's tennis, women's tennis, and volleyball. These are all sports that either compete head-to-head or face each other in the same tournament or meet. The winning team in each sport earns one point. Additionally, one point is awarded to the school with the most LIFE scholarship recipients, Palmetto Fellows scholarship recipients and entries in the Rival Play Second-Chance Promotion, respectively.

South Carolina won the first four consecutive Palmetto Series in the late 2010s. The closest was in 2017, with the Gamecocks only winning by one point.

There was no Palmetto Series in 2020, 2021 or 2022 due to COVID-19 restrictions. The "points chase" resumed in 2022–23 and soon had a new sponsor, the South Carolina Education Lottery.

South Carolina won the renewed Palmetto Series in 2023, the first Palmetto Series in which either school swept in the four major sports (football, men's basketball, women's basketball, and baseball). In 2024, during what was described as an "incredible year" for the university's athletics, Clemson claimed its first ever Palmetto Series, winning by one point.

South Carolina leads the all-time series, 6-2.

Clemson won the most recent Palmetto Series for the 2025-26 athletic year, 7–5.

South Carolina currently leads the 2026-27 Palmetto Series, 2-0.

== See also ==
- List of NCAA college football rivalry games
- List of most-played college football series in NCAA Division I
- List of college rivalries in the United States
- Sports in South Carolina
- Clemson–South Carolina football brawl
- 2002 College World Series
- 2010 College World Series

== Notes and references ==
=== Sources ===
- Ball, William Watts (1932). The State That Forgot; South Carolina's Surrender to Democracy. The Bobbs-Merrill Company.
- Cooper, William (2005). The Conservative Regime: South Carolina, 1877–1890. University of South Carolina Press. ISBN 1-57003-597-0.
- Edgar, Walter B. (1998). South Carolina: A History. University of South Carolina Press.
- Hollis, Daniel Walker (1951), University of South Carolina, vol. I, University of South Carolina Press
- Hollis, Daniel Walker (1956), University of South Carolina, vol. II, University of South Carolina Press
- Lesesne, Henry H. (2001). A History of the University of South Carolina, 1940–2000. University of South Carolina Press.
