= 2nd South Carolina Cavalry Regiment =

- Flag of South Carolina
- Active: August 22, 1862 to 1865
- Country: Confederate States of America
- Allegiance: South Carolina
- Branch: Confederate States Army
- Type: Cavalry
- Engagements: American Civil War: Second Battle of Manassas; Battle of South Mountain; Battle of Sharpsburg; Battle of Fredericksburg; Battle of Brandy Station; Second Battle of Winchester; Battle of Upperville; Battle of Gettysburg; Battle of Bristoe Station; Mine Run Campaign; Battle of Todd's Tavern; Battle of the Wilderness

Commanders
- Notable commanders: Lt Gen Wade Hampton III; Maj Gen Matthew C. Butler; Col Matthew C. Butler

Private William Stone of Co. D, 2nd South Carolina Cavalry Regiment

The 2nd South Carolina Cavalry Regiment was a cavalry regiment made from the Hampton's Legion cavalry Battalion. The 2nd served for most of the American Civil War mounted until the near end when dismounted.

== Formation ==
The 2nd South Carolina Cavalry was formed on August 22, 1862, by consolidating the 4th South Carolina Cavalry Battalion and the Hampton's Legion Cavalry Battalion. At formation, the 2nd had ten companies recruited mainly from the low country and the midlands of South Carolina.

Companies of the regiment:
Company: Nickname	District	Captain
A: "Boykin Mounted Rangers"	Kershaw	Alexander H. Boykin
B: "Beaufort District Troop"	Beaufort	Abraham M. Ruth
C: "Congaree Mounted Rifles"	Richland	John H. Meighan
D: "Wassa Massaw Rangers"	Charleston	Andrew J. Hydrick
E: "Dean's Cavalry"	Spartanburg	George B. Dean
F: "Easley's Cavalry"	Pickens	John Westfield
G: "Bonham's Light Dragoons"	Newberry	J. W. Gary
H: "Congaree Troop"	Richland	James P. Macfie
I: "Edgefield Hussars"	Edgefield	Tillman H. Clark
K: "Brooks Troop"	Greenville	Leonard Williams

== See also ==
- List of South Carolina Confederate Civil War units
