= List of professional sports teams in South Carolina =

South Carolina is the 23rd most populated state in the United States and has a rich history of professional sports.

== Active teams ==
Baseball
League	Team	City	Stadium	Capacity
SAL (High-A)	Greenville Drive	Greenville	Fluor Field at the West End	6,700
SAL (High-A)	Hub City Spartanburgers	Spartanburg	Fifth Third Park	5,250
CL (A)	Augusta GreenJackets	North Augusta	SRP Park	5,000
CL (A)	Charleston RiverDogs	Charleston	Joseph P. Riley Jr. Park	6,000
CL (A)	Columbia Fireflies	Columbia	Segra Park	9,077
CL (A)	Myrtle Beach Pelicans	Myrtle Beach	Pelicans Ballpark	6,599
Ice hockey
League	Team	City	Arena	Capacity
ECHL	Greenville Swamp Rabbits	Greenville	Bon Secours Wellness Arena	13,951
ECHL	South Carolina Stingrays	North Charleston	North Charleston Coliseum	10,537
FPHL	Pee Dee IceCats	Florence	Florence Center	7,526
Soccer
League	Team	City	Stadium	Capacity
USLC	Charleston Battery	Mount Pleasant	Patriots Point Soccer Complex	3,900
USL1	Greenville Triumph SC	Greenville	Paladin Stadium	16,000

=== Map of cities with a professional sports team ===
Location with a professional sports team

== See also ==
- Sports in South Carolina
