= List of Confederate units from South Carolina in the American Civil War =

Flag of South Carolina, adopted January 28, 1861.

This is a list of Confederate units from South Carolina in the American Civil War. The list of South Carolina Union Civil War units is shown separately.

== Infantry ==
- 1st Infantry, 6 months, 1861
- 1st (Butler's) Regulars
- 1st (Hagood's) Volunteers
- 1st (McCreary's) Infantry (Provisional Army)
- 1st Rifles (Orr's)
- 2nd Rifles
- 2nd Infantry (2nd Palmetto Regiment)
- 3rd Infantry
- 4th Infantry
- 5th Infantry
- 6th Infantry
- 7th Infantry
- 8th Infantry
- 9th Infantry
- 10th Infantry
- 11th Infantry (9th Volunteers)
- 12th Infantry
- 13th Infantry
- 14th Infantry
- 15th Infantry
- 16th Infantry (Greenville Regiment)
- 17th Infantry
- 18th Infantry
- 19th Infantry
- 20th Infantry
- 21st Infantry
- 22nd Infantry
- 23rd Infantry (Hatch's Regiment, Coast Rangers)
- 24th Infantry
- 25th Infantry (Eutaw Regiment)
- 26th Infantry
- 27th Infantry (Gaillard's)
- 1st (Charleston) Battalion, Infantry (Gaillard's)
- 3rd (Laurens' and James') Battalion, Infantry
- 4th Battalion, Infantry
- 5th Rifle Battalion
- 6th (Byrd's) Battalion, Infantry
- 7th (Nelson's) Battalion, Infantry (Enfield Rifles)
- 9th Battalion, Infantry (Pee Dee Legion)
- 11th Battalion, Infantry (see 25th Infantry)
- 13th Battalion, Infantry (4th and Mattison's)

== Sharpshooters ==
- 1st Battalion, Sharpshooters (see 27th Infantry)
- 2nd Battalion, Sharpshooters
- 1st Palmetto Sharp Shooters (Jenkins Regiment)

== Cavalry ==
- 1st Cavalry
- 2nd Cavalry
- 3rd Cavalry
- 4th Cavalry
- 5th Cavalry
- 6th Cavalry (1st Partisan Rangers)
- 7th Cavalry
- 1st Battalion, Cavalry
- 4th Battalion, Cavalry
- 8th Battalion, Cavalry
- 10th Battalion, Cavalry
- 12th Battalion, Cavalry (see 4th Cavalry)
- 14th Battalion, Cavalry
- 16th Battalion, Cavalry (see 6th Cavalry)
- 17th Battalion, Cavalry (see 5th Cavalry)
- 19th Battalion, Cavalry

== Artillery ==
- 1st Artillery
  - Brooks Light Artillery (Company B)
  - Pee Dee Artillery (Company D)
- 2nd Artillery
  - Inglis Light Artillery (Company D)
- 3rd Artillery
- 3rd (Palmetto) Battalion, Light Artillery
- 1st Battalion, Artillery
- 15th (Lucas') Battalion, Heavy Artillery
- 18th Battalion, Artillery
- German Light Artillery Battalion
  - Wagener's Company, Light Artillery (Company A)
  - Melchers' Company, Artillery (Company B)
- Manigault's Battalion, Artillery

== Legions ==
- Hampton's Legion
  - Infantry Battalion
  - Cavalry Battalion (2nd Cavalry Regiment)
    - Edgefield Hussars (Company A)
  - Hart's (Halsey's) Company, Horse Artillery (Washington Light Artillery)
- Holcombe Legion
  - Infantry Battalion
  - Cavalry Battalion

== Local organizations ==
=== Militia ===
- 1st Militia (Charleston Reserves)
- 1st Rifles, Militia (Branch's)
- 1st (Martin's) Mounted Militia
- 5th Militia
- 10th Militia
- 14th Militia
- 15th Militia
- 16th Militia
- 17th Militia
- 18th Militia
- 19th Militia
- 24th Militia
- 25th Militia
- 39th Militia
- 4th Cavalry, Militia
- 1st Regiment Artillery, Militia
- Harllee's Legion, Militia

=== State Troops ===
6 months' service, 1863-64

- 1st State Troops
- 2nd State Troops
- 3rd State Troops
- 4th State Troops
- 5th State Troops

=== Reserves ===
90 days' service, 1862-63

- 2nd Reserves
- 3rd Reserves
- 4th Reserves
- 5th Reserves
- 6th Reserves
- 7th Reserves
- 8th Reserves
- 9th Reserves
- 10th Reserves
- 11th Reserves
- 1st Battalion Reserves
- 2nd Battalion Reserves
- 3rd Battalion Reserves
- 4th Battalion, Reserves
- 5th (Brown's) Battalion, Reserves
- 6th (Merriwether's) Battalion, Reserves
- 7th (Ward's) Battalion, Reserves
- 8th (Stalling's) Battalion, Reserves
- 2nd Battalion, Cavalry Reserves
- Cunningham's Battalion, Reserves
- Ward's Battalion, Reserves

=== Other ===
- 1st Regiment Charleston Guards
- Bureau Battalion, Charleston
- Charleston Arsenal Battalion
- Naval Battalion, Charleston
- South Carolina College Cadets

== See also ==
- Lists of American Civil War Regiments by State
- Confederate Units by State
