= Palmetto Sharpshooters =

Confederate army unit in the American Civil War

1863 Richmond Depot flag of the Palmetto Sharpshooters

The South Carolina Palmetto Sharpshooters were a Confederate infantry unit in the American Civil War. The regiment served with the Army of Northern Virginia from 1862 to 1865. The unit would fight in most of the major campaigns in the eastern theater, including the Peninsula Campaign, the Overland Campaign, and the Siege of Petersburg.

== 1862 ==
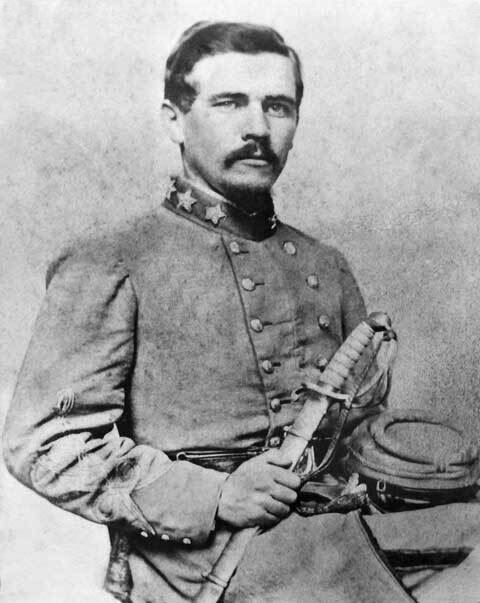
Colonel Micah Jenkins

The Palmetto Sharpshooters were organized and mustered into service in 1862, near Richmond, Virginia. The regiment was comprised mostly of men who had originally served in the 4th, 5th, and 9th South Carolina Infantry Regiments who were now re-enlisting after the experiment of their previous enlistment term. The regiment was commanded by Colonel Micah Jenkins, and was assigned to Richard Anderson's South Carolina Brigade. After mustering, the regiment was shipped to Yorktown, Virginia to join the Confederate army stationed there. Following the abandonment of Yorktown to George B. McClellan's Federal army, the Confederates withdrew to Williamsburg. There, the Palmetto Sharpshooters experienced their first battle during the Battle of Williamsburg in May 1862. The regiment held Fort Magruder against repeated Federal attacks, losing 29 men. Three weeks later, during Colonel Jenkins' famed charge at the Battle of Seven Pines, May 31-June 1, the Palmetto Sharpshooters assaulted the right flank of Union General Darius Couch's division, capturing numerous prisoners. According to Jenkins, the South Carolina brigade, now under his command, broke five successive Union lines and advanced more than two miles before halting their charge. The charge of the Palmetto Sharpshooters drew special attention from Confederate General Daniel Harvey Hill, who praised the efforts of the South Carolinians and referred to Jenkins' command as "his salvation." A few days prior to the battle General James Longstreet had presented the Palmetto Sharpshooters with a battle flag, which the regiment carried into battle on May 31. The color bearer would be shot during the assault, and as Colonel Jenkins rode past him the color bearer propped himself up on his elbows and exclaimed: "For God's sake, Colonel, take care of my flag!"

During the Seven Days Battles, the South Carolina Brigade assaulted Northern positions at the Battle of Gaines' Mill, capturing the colors and colonel of the 16th Michigan. Three days after Gaines' Mill, Jenkins' brigade was ordered by General Longstreet to open the Confederate assaults at the Battle of Glendale, June 30, 1862. General Longstreet claimed after the war that he had intended for Jenkins to utilize the Palmetto Sharpshooters to silence Federal batteries positioned along the New Market Road, but the overeager Jenkins' misinterpreted the order and instead initiated a frontal assault across an open field against the batteries. Despite receiving a galling volume of fire in their front, the South Carolinians briefly overran the Union artillery. However, Jenkins was forced to retreat in the face of Northern counterattacks. The brigade suffered harrowing loss during their charge at Glendale, with more than half of its number becoming casualties. The Palmetto Sharpshooters lost 254 men out of 375 on the field, a staggering casualty loss of 67.7%. Company "E" of the regiment would be devastated at Glendale, with only 2 men surviving unscathed. During the battle, all of the officers and non-commissioned officers in Company "L" would become casualties, prompting the company to be led for a time by a Private. The brigade would play majors roles in the Second Bull Run campaign and the Maryland campaign, repulsing Ambrose Burnside's attack south of Sharpsburg during the Battle of Antietam in September 1862. The Palmetto Sharpshooters and the South Carolina brigade were transferred to George Pickett's division, Longstreet's Corps shortly before the Battle of Fredericksburg.

== 1863 ==
Jenkins' brigade participated in Longstreet's Suffolk Campaign during the spring of 1863, and would be retained in Richmond during the Gettysburg campaign, thus missing the infamous charge made by George Pickett's division during the Battle of Gettysburg. In September 1863, Longstreet's Corps was sent to the western theater of the war, joining Braxton Braggs's Confederate Army of Tennessee. The brigade would fight in the subsequent Battle of Wauhatchie and Knoxville Campaign.

== 1864 ==
The regiment would be sent back east to Virginia as Union General Ulysses S. Grant's Overland Campaign went underway. During the Battle of the Wilderness Jenkin's brigade arrived on the field with the rest of Longstreet's Corps early on the morning of May 6. Shortly after arrival the brigade would be ordered to support an attack being made by General William Mahone's Virginia brigade up the Orange Plank Road. The Virginians, who were disoriented from their attack through the dense undergrowth of the Wilderness, mistook the South Carolinian brigade advancing up the Orange Plank Road for Union troops, and opened fire, wounding General Longstreet and killing Jenkins. An assault would be attempted again during the afternoon. Jenkins' Brigade, now under the command of Colonel John Bratton of the 6th South Carolina Infantry, led the attack against Federal entrenchments lining the Brock Road. The Confederate attack would see initial success, but Union counterattacks quickly sealed the breach in the Northern line. The next few weeks would see heavy fighting for the brigade during the battles at Spotsylvania Courthouse, North Anna, Totopotomy Creek, and Cold Harbor.

Casualties for the Palmetto Sharpshooters during the Overland Campaign numbered approximately:

- Wilderness: 8 killed, 65 wounded, 1 missing, Spotsylvania Courthouse: 4 killed, 28 wounded
- North Anna: 1 killed, 3 wounded, Totopotomy Creek: 2 killed, 4 wounded
- Cold Harbor: 3 killed, 6 wounded, 3 missing

Throughout the Siege of Petersburg the Palmetto Sharpshooters would fight in such battles as Second Deep Bottom, Second Reams Station, Fort Harrison. During the Battle of Darbytown Road in October 1864, Bratton's Brigade assaulted northern entrenchments positioned along the New Market Road, which included two Billinghurst Requa Guns manned by crews from the 16th New York Heavy Artillery. The South Carolinians were repulsed with heavy loss, the Palmetto Sharpshooters alone suffering around 92 casualties.

== 1865 ==
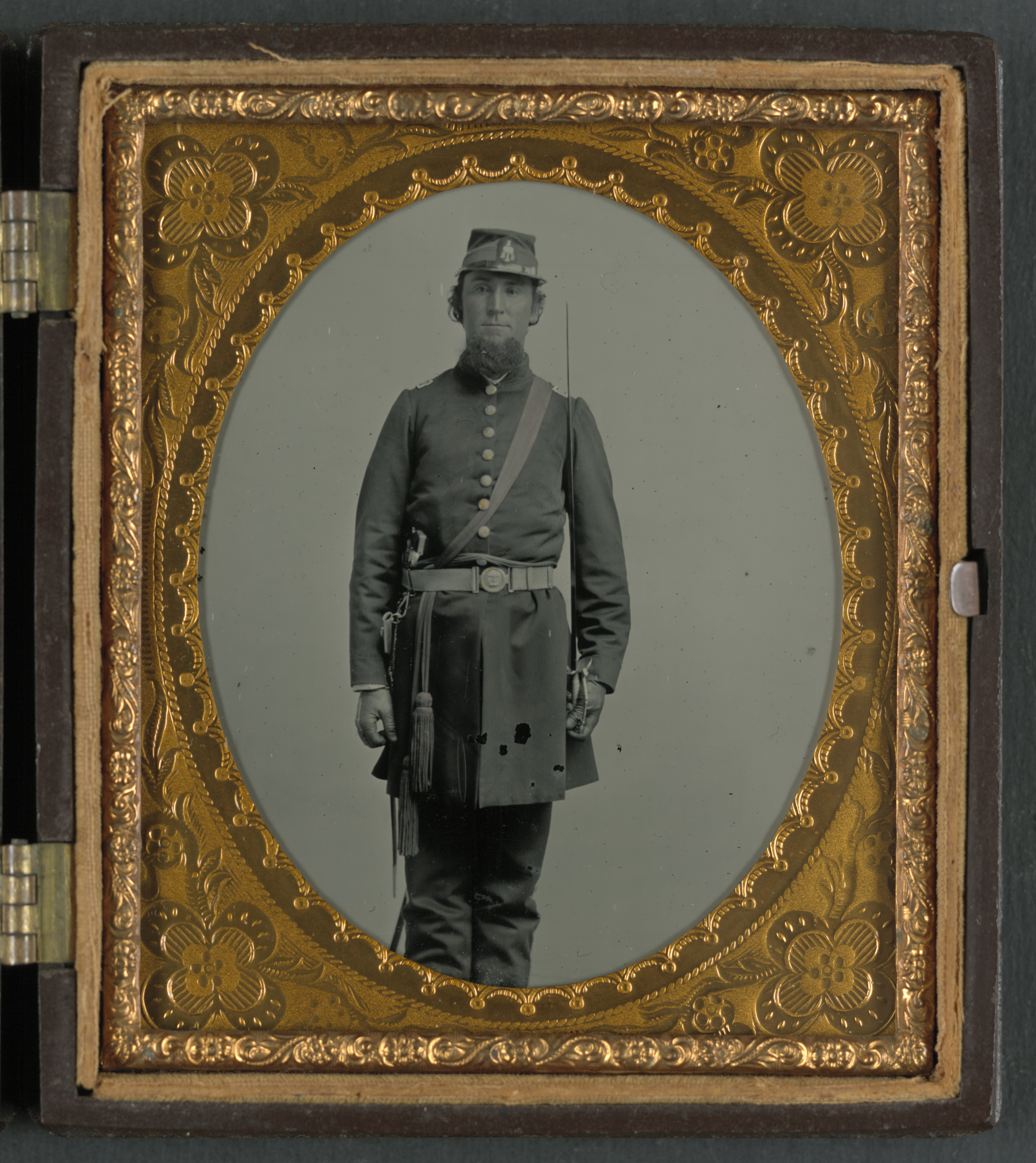
Colonel Joseph Walker

After the breakthrough at Petersburg and the fall of Richmond, the South Carolina Palmetto Sharpshooters surrendered at Appomattox Court House with the rest of the Army of Northern Virginia on April 9, 1865. The regiment was one of the largest in the Confederate army at the time of the surrender, numbering 29 officers and 356 men under the command of Colonel Joseph Walker. Ironically, during the surrender the South Carolinians shared rations and shook hands with the 16th Michigan, whose colors they had captured at Gaines' Mill two years ago.

== See also ==
- List of South Carolina Confederate Civil War units
