= Hampton's Legion =

- Flag of South Carolina
- Active: Summer 1861–1865
- Country: Confederate States of America
- Allegiance: Confederate States
- Branch: Confederate Volunteer Army
- Type: Multiple Component Legion
- Engagements: American Civil War

Commanders
- Notable commanders: Wade Hampton

Hampton's Legion was an American Civil War military unit of the Confederate States of America, organized and partially financed by wealthy South Carolina planter Wade Hampton III. Initially composed of infantry, cavalry, and artillery battalions, elements of Hampton's Legion participated in virtually every major campaign in the Eastern Theater, from the first to the last battle.

== History ==
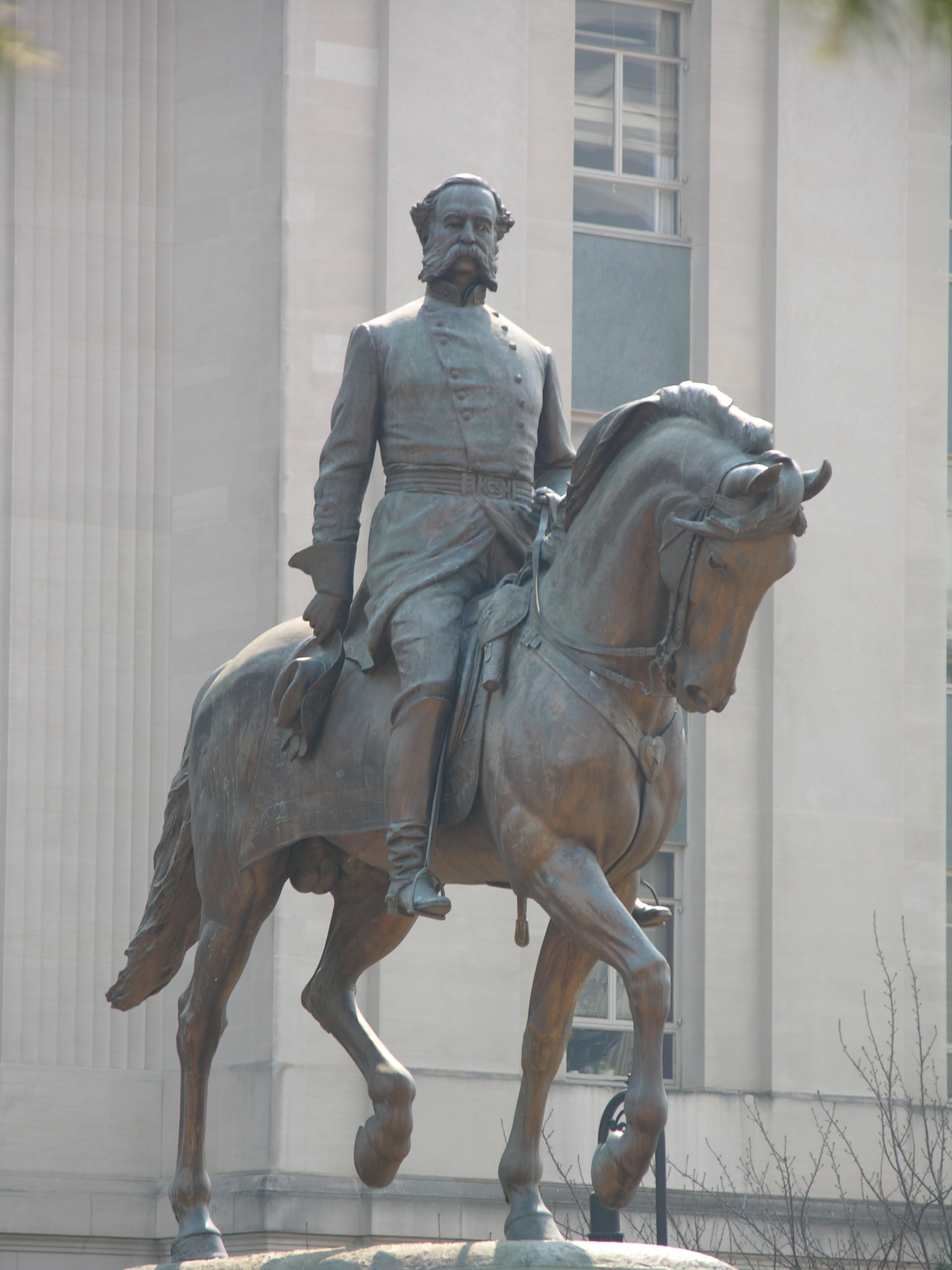
Wade Hampton statue on the South Carolina Statehouse lawn

A Civil War legion historically consisted of a single integrated command, with individual components including infantry, cavalry, and artillery. The concept of a multiple-branch unit was never practical for Civil War armies and, early in the war, the individual elements were often split up.

Organized by Wade Hampton in early 1861, Hampton's Legion initially boasted a large number of South Carolina's leading citizens, including future generals J. Johnston Pettigrew, Stephen Dill Lee, Martin W. Gary, and Matthew C. Butler. Originally, the Legion comprised six companies of infantry, two of cavalry, and one of light artillery. The infantry fought in the First Battle of Manassas, where Colonel Hampton suffered the first of several wounds in the war. In November 1861, the artillery was outfitted with four Blakely rifles imported from England and slipped through the Union blockade into Savannah, Georgia. By the end of the year, each element of the Legion had been expanded with new companies to bolster the effective combat strength.

With the reorganization of the Army of Northern Virginia in mid-1862, Hampton's Legion was broken up and reassigned. The cavalry battalion was consolidated with the 4th South Carolina Cavalry Battalion and two independent companies on August 22, 1862, and became the 2nd South Carolina Cavalry, under Colonel Butler. It remained directly under General Hampton's control and served in his brigade and then division for the rest of the war. The artillery was converted to horse artillery and renamed Hart's Battery, after its commander, Captain James F. Hart. Lieutenant Colonel Gary's infantry, retaining the designation Hampton's Legion, was initially brigaded with Georgia troops in Stonewall Jackson's command, but was transferred in June to John Bell Hood's "Texas Brigade." The Legion served in General Longstreet's Corps through mid-1863, before being transferred with that corps to the Army of Tennessee in September. On March 11, 1864, the infantry was mounted and assigned to General Gary's Cavalry Brigade and served in the Department of Richmond until January, 1865, when it was transferred to the Cavalry Corps, Army of Northern Virginia.

The various elements of the Legion fought in most of the major Eastern operations of 1862, including the Peninsula, Northern Virginia, and Maryland campaigns, suffering horrific losses. The Legion helped to dislodge Union troops at the battle of Chinn Ridge, and the Second Battle of Bull Run, and to inflict a substantial number of casualties on the 5th New York Regiment. Battered at Antietam, the much-depleted Legion infantry was sent to the rear and performed garrison duty for months while refitting and recruiting. It did not participate actively in the early part of the Gettysburg campaign (unlike the cavalry and artillery elements, which played a major role in several battles during the campaign). It fought a minor rear-guard action at Boonsboro, Maryland, during the army's retreat from Gettysburg. It returned to action in the fall of 1863 in Longstreet's Corps during the Battle of Chickamauga and the subsequent Chattanooga campaign. The Legion infantry later returned to Virginia and in March 1864 was converted to mounted infantry and assigned to Gary's Cavalry Brigade in the Department of Richmond. They served in that department until January 1865, when the brigade was reassigned to Fitzhugh Lee's Cavalry Division. It harassed Federal supply depots throughout northern Virginia and fought in several actions during the lengthy Siege of Petersburg.

What was left of the Hampton Legion infantry surrendered with General Robert E. Lee at Appomattox Court House in early April 1865. The South Carolina cavalry regiment and the horse artillery (by then renamed Halsey's Battery after Hart's wounding) participated in the Carolinas campaign with General Hampton and surrendered at Bennett Place in North Carolina along with the rest of General Joseph E. Johnston's forces on April 26.

== Organization of the Legion ==
=== Original composition ===
Six companies of infantry:

Co. A Washington Light Infantry Volunteers (Charleston)
Co. B Watson Guards (Edgefield)
Co. C Manning Guards (Sumter)
Co. D Gist Riflemen (Anderson)
Co. E Bozeman Guards (Greenville)
Co. F Davis Guards (Greenville)

Cavalry battalion:

Co. A Edgefield Hussars (Edgefield)
Co. B Brooks Troop (Greenville)

Co. C Beaufort District Troop (Beaufort)

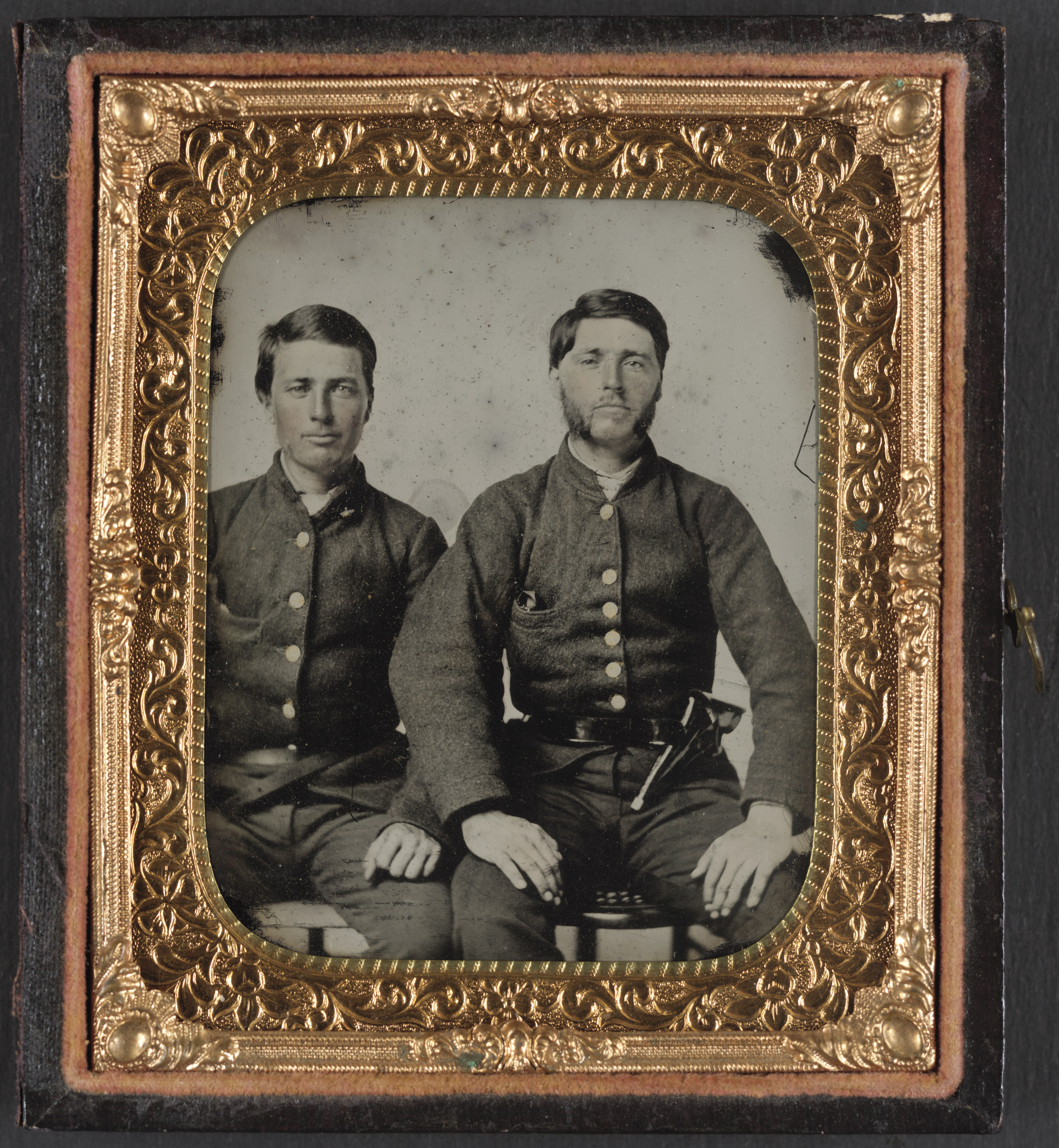
Brothers Private Stephen D. and Private Moses M. Boynton of Co. C, Beaufort District Troop, Hampton Legion South Carolina Cavalry Battalion

Artillery:

Washington Artillery (Charleston)

=== Additional units ===
Infantry:

Co. G Claremont Rifles (Statesburg) 19 Aug 1861
Co. H (1st) German Volunteers (Charleston) 22 Aug 1861
Co. H (2nd) South Carolina Zouave Volunteers 29 Jul 1862
Co. I Capt. D.L. Hall's company 11 Nov 1862
Co. K Capt. John H. Bowen's company 11 Nov 1862

Cavalry:

Co. D Congaree Troop (Columbia) 5 Aug 1861

Artillery:

Co. B German Artillery (Co. H (1st)) 1 Nov 1861

== Major engagements ==
- First Manassas – infantry and cavalry (artillery was not outfitted with guns in time)
- Peninsular Campaign – all elements
- Seven Days Battles – all elements
- Second Manassas – all elements
- Sharpsburg – infantry
- Tennessee Campaign – infantry
- Gettysburg – cavalry and artillery
- Wilderness – primarily infantry
- Siege of Petersburg – all elements at various times
- Battle of Appomattox Court House – infantry
- Battle of Bentonville – cavalry and artillery

== See also ==
- List of South Carolina Confederate Civil War units
- List of American Civil War legions
- William Aiken Walker (1839-1921), American painter and member of Hampton's Legion
