= Washington Light Infantry =

Company B of the 118th Infantry, South Carolina National Guard
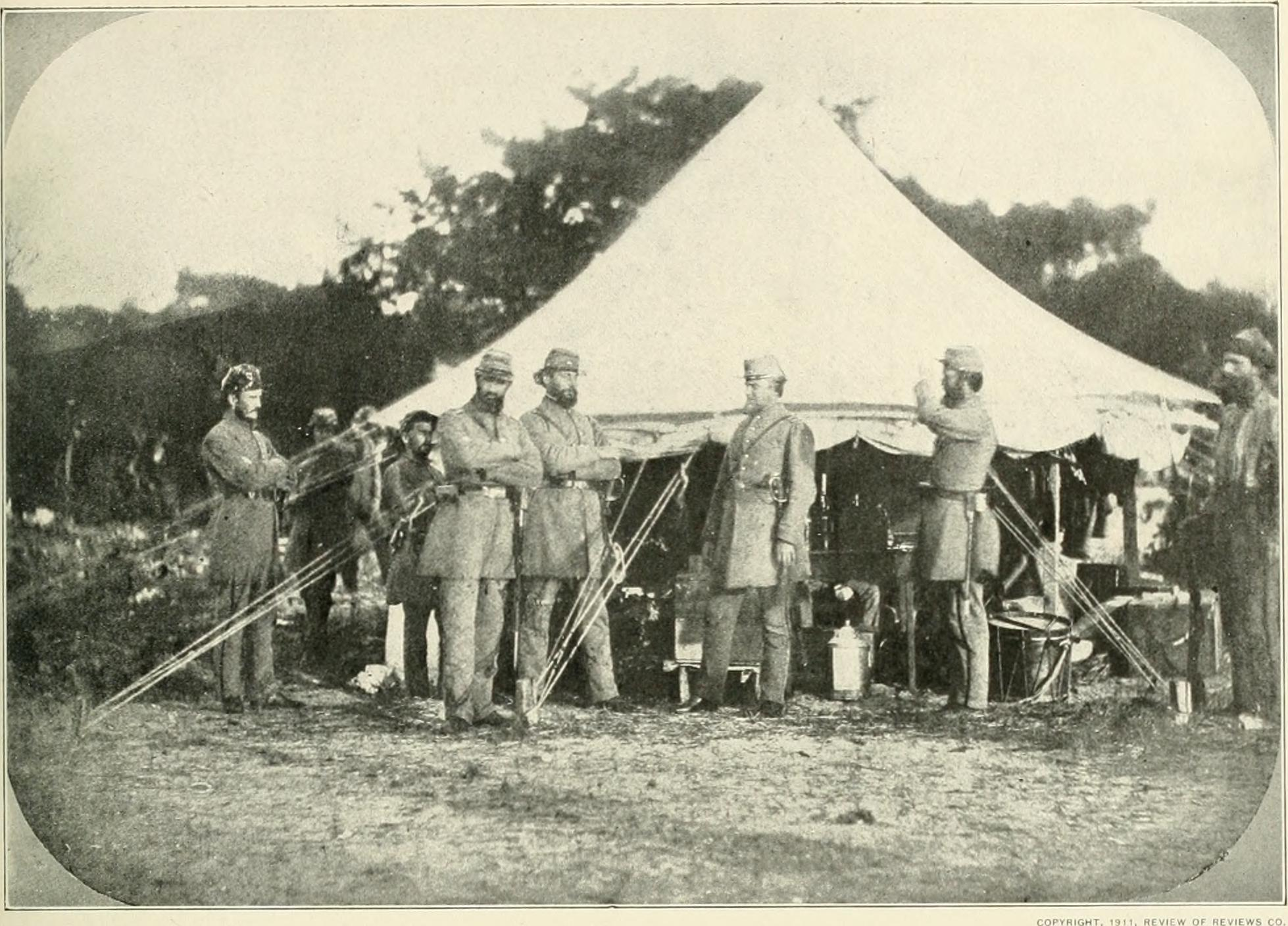
- Garrison duty in Charleston
- Active: 1807–
- Country: United States
- Branch: South Carolina Army National Guard
- Nickname: "Washington Light Infantry"
- Engagements: War of 1812; Seminole Wars; Mexican War; American Civil War; World War I World War II

The Washington Light Infantry is a military and social organization located in Charleston, South Carolina. Founded in 1807, it is one of the oldest of these militia groups still active in the United States.

Following the American Revolutionary War, tensions lingered between the fledgling United States and Great Britain, and many Americans feared another war. In cities across the new country, citizens organized themselves into private militia groups. Several were established in Charleston, including the Washington Light Artillery, which was named for George Washington. The company was first mustered into active service during the War of 1812, but did not see combat as British troops did not invade South Carolina. In 1827, the widow of Colonel William Washington presented the company with his old Revolutionary War battleflag.

In 1836, the company was activated and sent to Florida to combat hostile Seminole Indians during the Seminole Wars. They guarded the city of St. Augustine. Six years later, the company helped establish the South Carolina Military Academy (now The Citadel). During the Mexican–American War, the company became part of the Palmetto Regiment and marched into Mexico City in the army of Winfield Scott.

Washington Light Infantry 175th Anniversary Medal awarded to members of the South Carolina Corps of Cadets.

When South Carolina seceded from the Union in early 1861, the Washington Light Artillery reformed into three distinct companies and served in the Confederate Army during the American Civil War. One company became Company A of the Hampton Legion. A total of 414 men served in the unit during the war, 114 of which were killed.

Following the war, the survivors returned home and helped reopen the closed military academy in 1882. They also formed the Washington Light Infantry Charitable Association to assist the families of fallen Confederate soldiers, as well as those men who had been invalided or otherwise disabled while on duty. (This organization still exists as the W.L.I. Charity Fund.)

In 1916, the unit took the field again, serving as border guards with Mexico near El Paso, Texas, at the request of President Woodrow Wilson. A year later, following the United States' entry into World War I, the WLI served in the United States Army overseas in the 105th Ammunition Train, 55th Field Artillery Brigade, 30th Division.

Following the armistice, the National Guard reorganized, and many of the state militia units were redesignated. The Washington Light Infantry became Company B of the 118th Infantry, South Carolina National Guard. In May 1921, the unit guarded ships and docks on behalf of the United States Shipping Board during a bitter dispute between sailors and shipping companies over wages.

Parts of the National Guard were sent overseas during World War II, and Company A was reinstituted for guard duty on the home front.

A military banquet is held in Charleston annually on February 22 coincident with Washington's Birthday.

== See also ==
- List of South Carolina Confederate Civil War units
