= South Carolina College Cadets =

- Flag of South Carolina
- Active: Mar. 13 1825 to Nov. 19 1856; Dec. 3 1860 to Dec. 10 1861
- Country: Confederate States of America
- Allegiance: South Carolina
- Type: Militia
- Nicknames: Lafayette Guards, S.C.C. Cadets
- Mottos: Juncta Juvant (Strength in unity); Ducit Amor Patriae (Led by Love of Country)
- Engagements: Battle of Fort Sumter

Commanders
- Spring 1861: Captain John H. Gary
- Mid 1861: Captain Charles Scott Venable
- Fall 1861: Captain E. Dawkins Rodgers

The South Carolina College Cadets were students at South Carolina College, now known as the University of South Carolina, who formed a militia company during antebellum South Carolina and during the Civil War to fight for the South. They offered their company three times for service in the Confederate army, but were denied each time by Governor Pickens.

== History ==
The company was first organized as a ceremonial unit to honor and commemorate General Lafayette during his visit to Columbia in March 1825. Called the Lafayette Guards, they were authorized by Governor Richard Irvine Manning I and were provided with arms from the state armory. The dress uniform worn by the company was a dark grey swallowtail coat, white lafayette pants and chapeau for the head dress. The cadets so distinguished themselves that the company was made a permanent organization of the college. However, the company was disbanded in 1856 when a riot between the students and the Columbia police almost descended into bloodshed.

After John Brown's raid on Harpers Ferry in 1859, the students unsuccessfully petitioned for the reorganization of the cadet company. As the secession movement picked up pace after the election of Abraham Lincoln in the fall of 1860, the Board of Trustees voted to allow the students to reorganize the cadet company on December 3, 1860. They were placed under the strict supervision of the faculty and were only able to be called out for service with the approval the college president.

The first company organized in the spring of 1861 was composed of four officers, thirteen non-commissioned officers, and ninety privates. They were trained and drilled according to Hardee's tactics by the captain of the state arsenal, Hugh Smith Thompson. On April 12 with the outbreak of hostilities at Fort Sumter, the cadet company tendered its services to Governor Pickens. He accepted the unit as part of the militia and ordered the company to hold in Columbia. The students wanted to take part in the action in Charleston and felt that the holding order was meant to keep them away from the fight. The cadets disbanded their company and telegraphed Governor Pickens just before their train left for Charleston that they had reorganized a new company. They arrived in Charleston during the evening, received orders from General Beauregard, and spent the night at the Hibernian Hall. On the morning of April 13, the cadets boarded a tug boat bound for Sullivan's Island. While en route, Major Anderson and the Union garrison fired upon the cadets on the boat, although no one was hit. The cadets were quartered at Fort Moultrie and their duty was to guard against a possible amphibious assault by the Union army. At the end of three weeks, the cadets received orders to return to Columbia to resume their classes.

During the latter part of June, the students reformed the cadet company to volunteer for service in Virginia. They chose the college's professor of mathematics and native of Virginia, Charles Scott Venable, to lead the company. Nevertheless, Governor Pickens denied the students permission to join the fight in Virginia stating that "the war would be of short duration and that the Government needed statesmen more than soldiers." The governor also felt that the students would be better served if they were scattered about rather than in one compact body. The cadet company disbanded and many left the college to volunteer for service in the Confederate Army.

The Union victory at the Battle of Port Royal alarmed the students since a great number came from the Lowcountry. On November 8, the cadet company offered their services to Governor Pickens for coastal defense. The same day, they proceeded to Charleston before heading to Port Royal to report to General Drayton. However, once in Charleston, the students were detained by the governor to act as his bodyguard. Governor Pickens ordered the cadet company to be mustered out of service on December 10 after a lack of Union activity in South Carolina. Rather than head back to college, most of the students enlisted in the army and the college was eventually forced to close on March 8, 1862, due to lack of students.

== See also ==
- List of South Carolina Confederate Civil War units

== See also ==
- South Carolina Civil War Confederate Units
- University Grays
