= Edgefield Hussars =

The Edgefield Hussars comprised a military company raised in the state of South Carolina. It served in the Confederate States Army during the American Civil War, being redesignated as Company A, Cavalry Battalion, Hampton Legion. It fought in numerous battles in the Eastern Theater.

The original militia company was formed in 1833 by Capt. Andrew Pickens Butler, in Edgefield, South Carolina. By 1851, it was a part of the Edgefield Squadron, 2nd Regiment of Cavalry, South Carolina Militia. On May 8, 1861, the company was accepted into Confederate service as part of Hampton’s Legion. It later became Company I, 2nd South Carolina Cavalry Regiment, when the cavalry battalion of the Legion was reorganized on August 22, 1862.

== Civil War ==
=== Officers ===
- Matthew Calbraith Butler, Captain
- J. J. Bunch, 1st Lieutenant
- J. D. Crafton, 2nd Lieutenant
- James M. Lanham, 3rd Lieutenant

=== Uniform ===
The original uniform of the Edgefield Hussars most likely consisted of an eight-button light-colored (probably grey) sack coat with tape trim of lighter hue around a low standing collar. A single small button was sewn at the end of a blind button hole on either side of this collar. Pants were the same color, and the headgear consisted of an M1851 dress cap of darker hue with stiffening removed with the initial ‘EH’.

=== Flags ===
The original flag carried by the company consisted of a dark blue silk field, 34 ½ inches on the staff by 40 ½ inches on the fly, bounded on three sides with a ¼ inch gold border, to which is attached a 1 ½ inch gold metallic fringe. The obverse bears a palmetto tree embroidered in green, brown, gold and white, standing on an island of the same colors. Arched above the tree ‘SOUTH CAROLINA’ is embroidered in 1 ¾ inch gold metallic block letters. Counterarched below the tree is the unit designation ‘EDGEFIELD HUSSARS’ in a similar style. The reverse contains a single six-pointed star in the center, measuring 3 ½ inches across, worked in gold metallic thread. The mottos ‘STATE SOVEREIGNTY’ and ‘EDGEFIELD HUSSARS’, arc above and below this star are embroidered in the same style as on the reverse.

A second flag was presented to the unit on June 24, 1861, made by the wife of Lieutenant James Lanham. The Edgefield Advertiser described it as a Confederate flag with the following additions, where one side is a Palmetto tree overtopped with the Crescent, with the name ‘Edgefield Hussars’ gilded on a white bar. On the other side contains a full circle of stars, and on a white bar, the motto ‘OUR CAUSE, OUR HOMES, OUR HONOR’

=== Arms and equipment ===
The original arms consisted of whatever could be locally procured mainly consisting of shotguns and revolvers.

== See also ==
- List of South Carolina Confederate Civil War units
