= Sports in South Carolina =

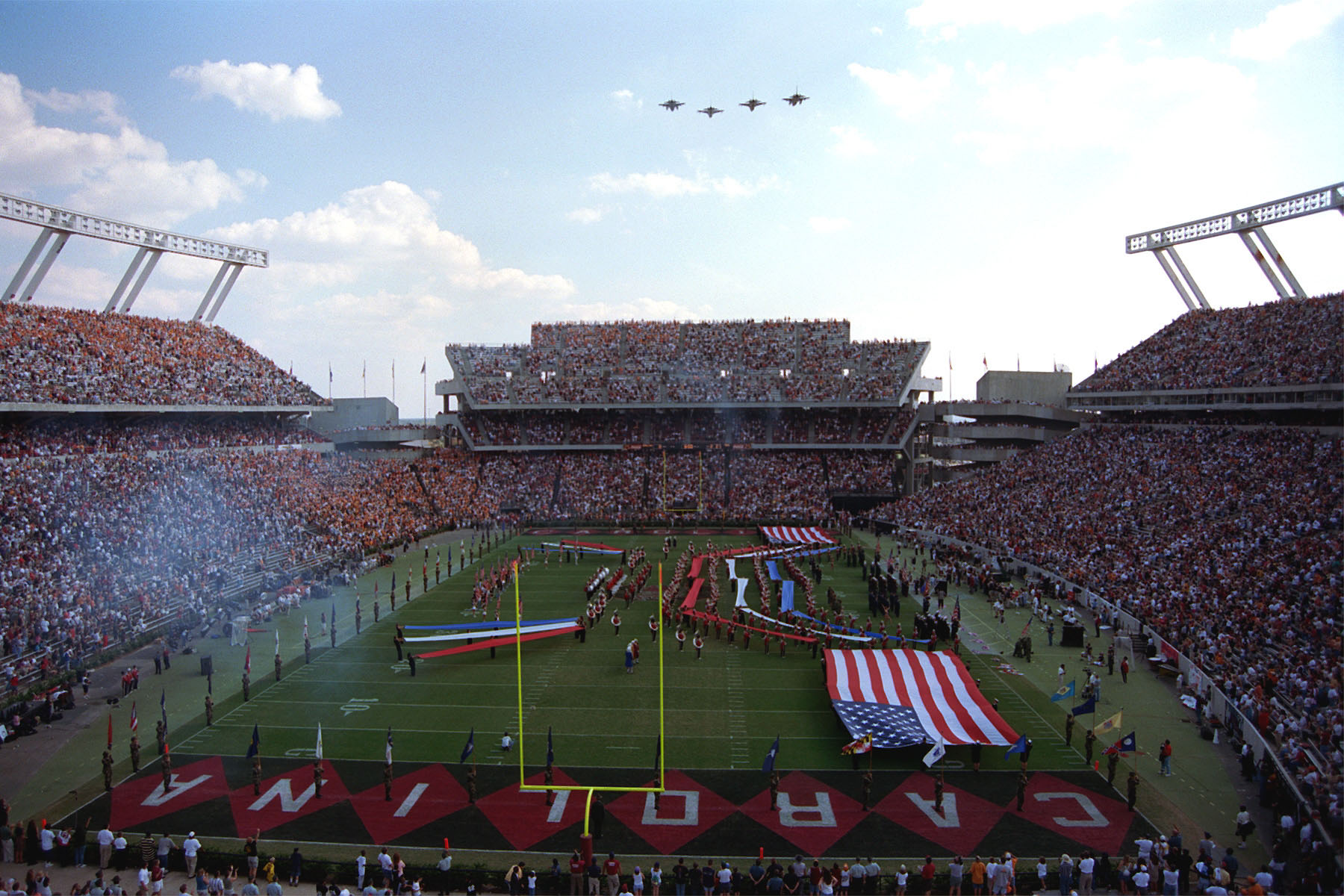
S. Carolina Gamecocks football game at Williams–Brice Stadium in Columbia

A variety of sports are popular in the US state of South Carolina.

College football is generally regarded as the most popular sport. Memorial Stadium and Williams–Brice Stadium are two of the 55 largest stadiums in the world. Clemson University and the University of South Carolina are both ranked in the top 27 colleges in the country in athletic revenue. Their rivalry is considered one of the best in college sports, and their annual football game (the Palmetto Bowl) is considered the most important sporting event in the state.

There are no major league professional franchises based in South Carolina. However, the state does have numerous minor league and lower-division (soccer) teams. Additionally, the Carolina Panthers and Charlotte FC, two major league professional teams based in Charlotte near the South Carolina border, have shown an interest in representing both of the Carolinas.

Myrtle Beach is the self-proclaimed "Golf Capital of the World", with around ninety courses. The Grand Strand and Hilton Head areas are both ranked in the top four locations in the country in golf courses per capita. The state is also a prime destination for water sports. A government survey from 2000 found that South Carolina had the seventh most surfers of any state in the nation.

== Table ==
The following table shows the sports teams in South Carolina that average over 8,000 fans per home game:

Team	Competition	Location	Venue (capacity)	Attendance
Clemson Tigers football	NCAA FBS – ACC	Clemson	Memorial Stadium (81,500)	80,400
South Carolina Gamecocks football	NCAA FBS – SEC	Columbia	Williams-Brice Stadium (80,250)	73,628
South Carolina Gamecocks men's basketball	NCAA D-I – SEC	Columbia	Colonial Life Arena (18,000)	11,472
Coastal Carolina Chanticleers football	NCAA FBS – Sun Belt	Conway	Brooks Stadium (20,000)	10,463
South Carolina Gamecocks women's basketball	NCAA D-I – SEC	Columbia	Colonial Life Arena (18,000)	10,406
The Citadel Bulldogs football	NCAA FCS – SoCon	Charleston	Johnson Hagood Stadium (14,500)	9,343
South Carolina State Bulldogs football	NCAA FCS – MEAC	Orangeburg	Oliver C. Dawson Stadium (22,000)	9,174

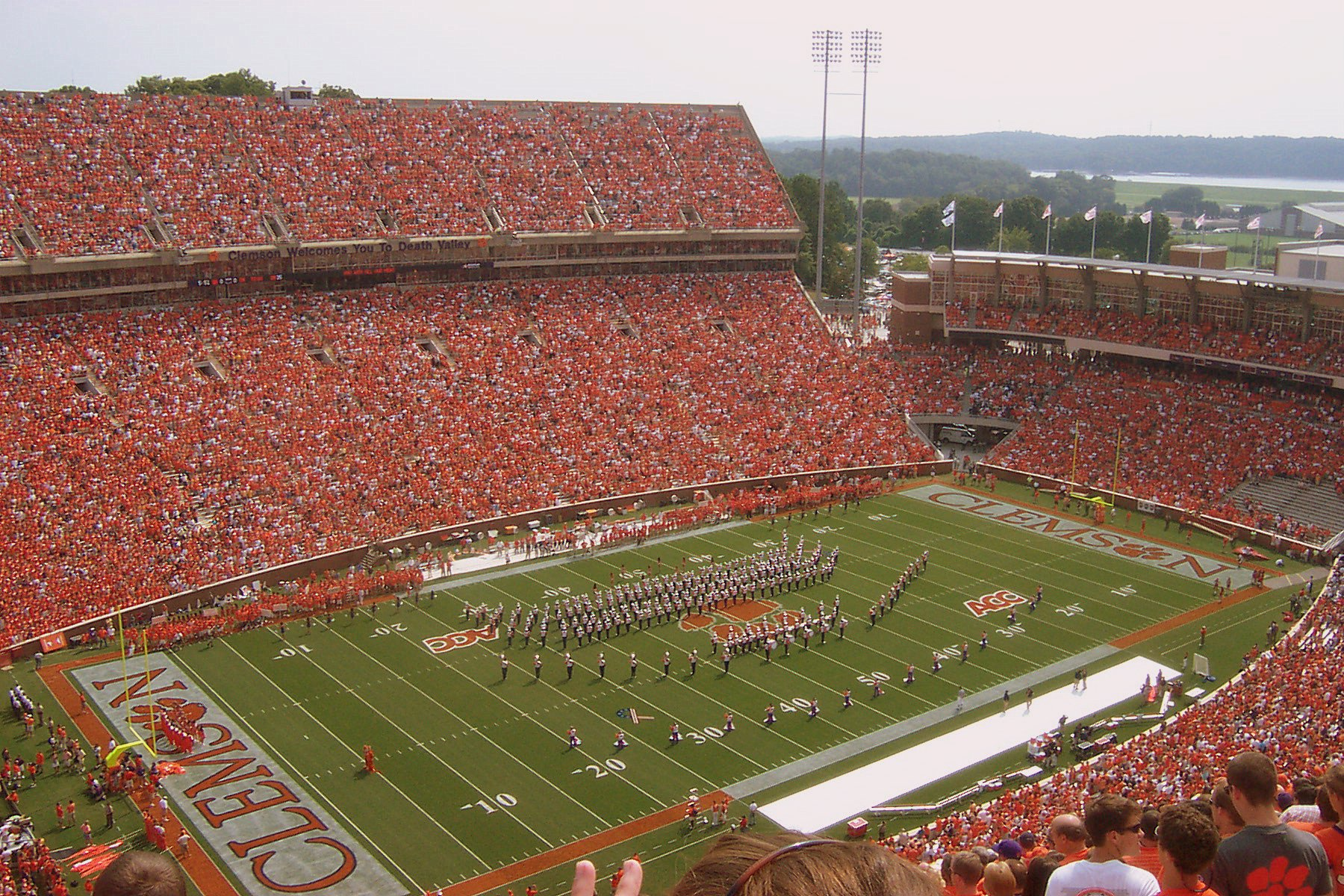
Clemson Tigers football game at Memorial Stadium (Death Valley) in Clemson

== College sports ==
College sports — particularly college football — are very big in South Carolina. The University of South Carolina's Gamecocks and Clemson University's Tigers regularly draw more than 77,000 spectators at the schools' home football games, placing them among the top fifteen schools in average attendance. Their rivalry is called the Battle of the Palmetto State. Clemson's football team won the national championship in 1981, 2016 and 2018. Both South Carolina's and Clemson's baseball teams are consistently ranked, with the Gamecocks winning the national title in 2010 and 2011. The South Carolina men's and women's basketball teams both made the Final Four of their respective tournaments in 2017, with the women winning the national title. South Carolina's women's basketball team also won national titles in 2022 and 2024.

Clemson and South Carolina are the two most prominent of the state's 11 NCAA Division I members. They are the only two schools that are members of the so-called Power Five conferences, the most prominent leagues in the top level of American college football, the Football Bowl Subdivision (FBS).

The Tigers additionally have an ice hockey team that competes at club level in the South Division of the Atlantic Coastal Conference.

Clemson is a charter member of the Atlantic Coast Conference, and South Carolina is in the Southeastern Conference. The Coastal Carolina Chanticleers are the state's newest FBS program, having completed a transition from the Football Championship Subdivision (FCS) in 2018. Coastal, whose baseball team won the College World Series in 2016, joined the Sun Belt Conference for non-football sports the day after it won the CWS, joined Sun Belt football in 2017, and became full FBS members in 2018. Six other schools that play Division I football are full members of FCS conferences. The Citadel Bulldogs, Furman Paladins, and Wofford Terriers are all in the Southern Conference; the Charleston Southern Buccaneers are members of the Big South Conference; and the South Carolina State Bulldogs compete in the Mid-Eastern Athletic Conference. The Presbyterian Blue Hose played their final season of Big South football in 2019; they remain Big South members in non-football sports, but the football team played the 2020 season as an FCS independent before joining the single-sport Pioneer Football League in 2021. Finally, three schools are full members of Division I conferences but do not sponsor football. The Charleston Cougars compete in the Colonial Athletic Association, and the USC Upstate Spartans and Winthrop Eagles compete in the Big South.

== Major league ==
South Carolina has no major professional franchise of the NFL, NHL, NBA, MLS, or MLB located in the state; however the NFL's Carolina Panthers (based in Charlotte, North Carolina), the NBA's Charlotte Hornets (based in Charlotte, North Carolina), the NHL's Carolina Hurricanes (based in Raleigh, North Carolina), and MLS' Charlotte FC (based in Charlotte, North Carolina) are considered to represent both North and South Carolina. In addition, the Panthers played their first season in Clemson.

The highest level of professional sports played by a team from South Carolina is the Charleston Battery, who play in the USL Championship, the second division of the U.S. Soccer pyramid.

== Minor league ==
There are numerous minor league teams that are either based in the state, or play much of their schedule within its borders. The Charlotte Knights, a Class AAA minor league baseball team, played at a stadium in Fort Mill, South Carolina, just across the border from Charlotte until the team moved to a new ballpark in Uptown Charlotte in 2014. Currently, six teams play in the state, all at the Class A level. The Greenville Drive and Hub City Spartanburgers play in the High-A South Atlantic League, and the Augusta GreenJackets (in North Augusta), Charleston RiverDogs, Columbia Fireflies, and Myrtle Beach Pelicans play in the Low-A Carolina League.

For a state where natural ice is a rarity, professional ice hockey has been popular in a number of areas of the state since the 1990s. Though four teams competed at one time in South Carolina, the ECHL (formerly called the East Coast Hockey League) currently oversees operations of only two franchises, the Greenville Swamp Rabbits and the South Carolina Stingrays. The Stingrays play in the North Charleston Coliseum, located in North Charleston.

The Charleston Battery play professional soccer in the USL Championship, the second division of the U.S. Soccer pyramid, which is technically not a minor league as the concept doesn't apply to the soccer tier system. The team plays in the soccer-specific Patriots Point Soccer Complex, located in Mount Pleasant. Founded in 1993, the Battery are the oldest continuously operating soccer club in the United States. Greenville Triumph SC are members of USL League One, a step below the Championship in the third division, and played their inaugural season in 2019. The Triumph play their home matches at Paladin Stadium.

The American Basketball Association currently oversees operations of only three semi-pro basketball franchises, the South Carolina Warriors which are based in Myrtle Beach, the Greenville Galaxy which are based in Greenville, and the Palmetto State Rizers which are based in Columbia.

== NASCAR racing ==
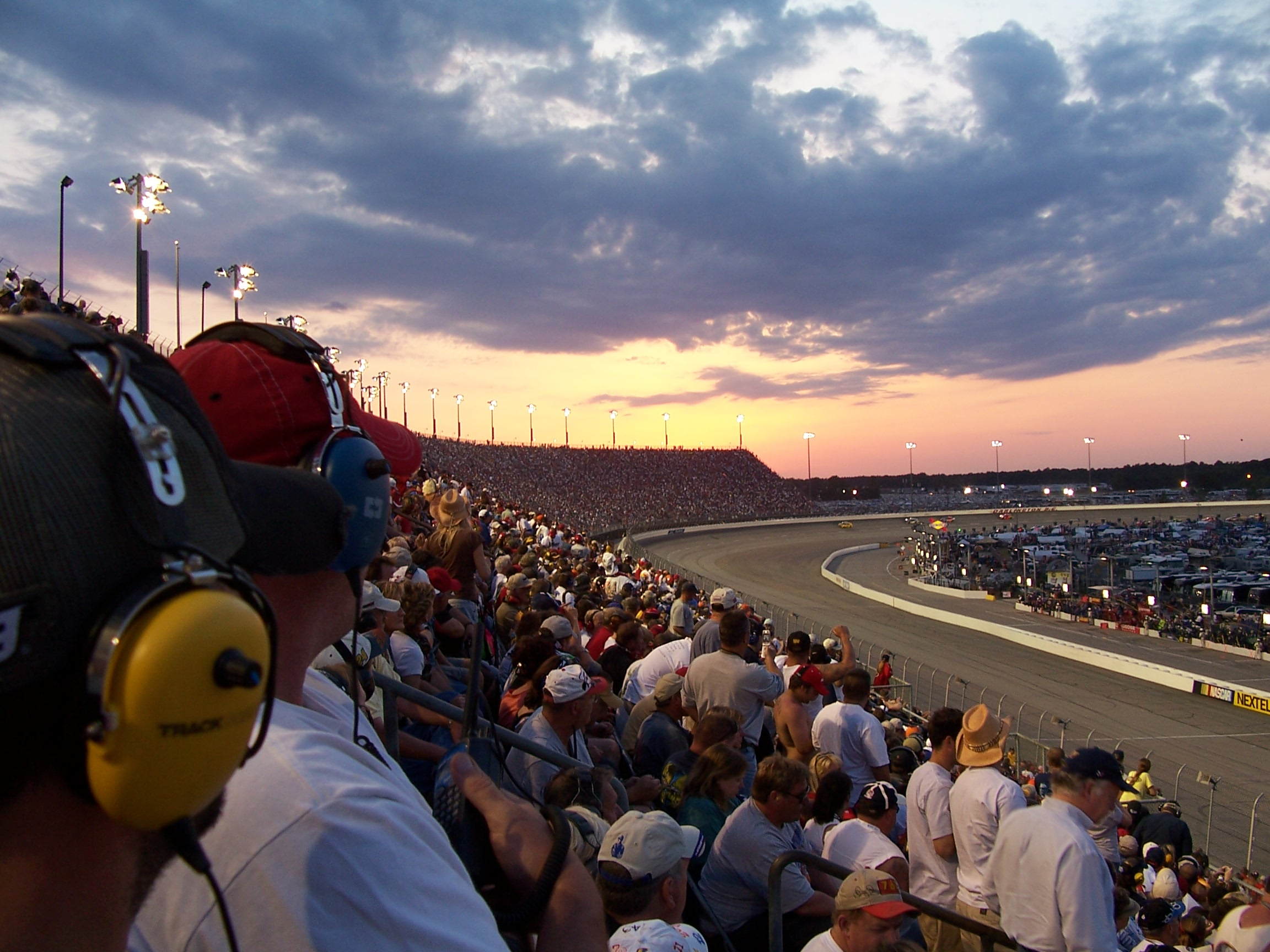
A race at Darlington Raceway in Darlington

NASCAR racing was born in the South, and South Carolina has in the past hosted some very important NASCAR races, at the Darlington Raceway. Darlington Raceway plays host to NASCAR's Labor Day weekend classic, the Southern 500. The Truck, Xfinity Series, and Cup Series cars all race at Darlington.

== Golf ==
South Carolina is a popular golf destination. With nearly one hundred golf courses, the Grand Strand region has more public golf courses per capita than any other place in the country. Some have hosted PGA and LGPA events in the past, but most have been designed for the casual golfer.

Hilton Head Island and Kiawah Island have several golf courses and host professional events each year. The RBC Heritage, previously known as the Heritage Classic or simply the Heritage, is a PGA Tour event held at Sea Pines Plantation on Hilton Head Island, South Carolina. First played in 1969, it is currently held in mid-April, the week after the Masters Tournament in Augusta, Georgia.

The upstate of South Carolina also has many nice golf courses, most of the nicer courses are private including the Cliff's courses and Cross Creek Plantation (the Cliff's courses host the annual BMW PRO/AM that brings many celebrities and professionals to South Carolina. Cross Creek Plantation located in Seneca, also private hosted a PGA Qualifier in the 90's). In 2007, The Ocean Course, the signature course of the Kiawah Island Golf Resort, was ranked #1 in Golf Digest magazine's "America's 50 Toughest Golf Courses" and #38 on their "America's 100 Greatest Golf Courses".

== Water sports ==
Water sports are also an extremely popular activity in South Carolina. With a long coast line, South Carolina has many different beach activities such as surfing, boogie boarding, deep sea fishing, and shrimping. The Pee Dee region of the state offers exceptional fishing. Some of the largest catfish ever caught were caught in the Santee Lakes. The Upstate of South Carolina also offers outstanding water activities, especially in Lakes Hartwell, Jocassee, and Keowee. The Midlands region also offers water-based recreation revolving around Lakes Marion and Murray and such rivers as the Congaree, Saluda, Broad, and Edisto, including water skiing and swimming.

== Roller Sports ==
Following the rebirth of roller derby in the early 2000s and the release of the movie Whip It, South Carolina has seen the rise of several roller derby leagues. As of 2014, there were four leagues sanctioned under WFTDA, each of which were located in Columbia, Charleston, and Greenville.

== Misc. Sports ==
While there are no race tracks with betting in South Carolina, there is significant horse training activity, particularly in Aiken and Camden, which hold steeplechase races.

Professional bass fishing tournaments are also found in South Carolina. Lake Hartwell, Lake Wylie, and Lake Murray both host Bassmaster Classic tournaments.

Spartanburg, South Carolina, is also the home of the national evangelical sports program Upward Sports.

== See also ==
- Sports in Columbia, South Carolina
- Sports in Sumter, South Carolina
- South Carolina Gamecocks
- Clemson Tigers
