= Ocean Isle Beach house fire =

2007 fire in North Carolina, United States

- Date: October 28, 2007
- Venue: Three-story beach house
- Location: Ocean Isle Beach, Brunswick County, North Carolina; 33.891°N 78.427°W
- Type: Fire
- Deaths: 7
- Injuries: 6

The Ocean Isle Beach house fire occurred on October 28, 2007. Shortly before 7 a.m., a four alarm fire severely damaged a three-story beach house on a waterfront lot on Scotland Street in Ocean Isle Beach, a town in Brunswick County, North Carolina, United States. The house was occupied by 13 college students on a weekend vacation and was owned by the family of one. Twelve of the college students attended the University of South Carolina, Columbia campus, while the thirteenth attended Clemson University. Seven people were killed, all by smoke inhalation and carbon monoxide poisoning. It was the deadliest fire in Brunswick county in decades. The following September, many students joined several of the survivors and mothers of fire victims in a trip to Washington DC to advocate additional congressional efforts regarding fire safety and prevention.

== Home description ==
The three-story frame beach house, which was raised on stilts with an additional ground floor for parking, was situated on the barrier island portion of Ocean Isle Beach, adjacent to the Intracoastal Waterway. Although smoke alarms were present and had activated within the house, it had no sprinkler system or alarm monitoring system, neither of which were required by building codes or local laws. Survivors of the fire said smoke detectors woke them "with only moments to escape."

== Fire ==
Witnesses heard the smoke alarms sounding as the house became fully involved on the windy morning before the first units of the local Fire Department arrived on scene four minutes after notification. Seeing the smoke, the first responding units immediately called for additional manpower by radio during their approach even before they arrived on scene.

Five students who were on the home's first floor got out. Only one occupant of the second floor, a male, was able to escape. He jumped from a window at the equivalent of a third-story height into a canal located adjacent to the edge of the property. There were some reports that a second male student also escaped through a lower floor window.

Town Fire Chief Robert Yoho stated that who survived and who did not seemed to be almost entirely based upon where they were in the house when awakened by the smoke alarms. "All the survivors came from the first floor, with the exception of one, and that is the one that jumped from the third-story window" he told a reporter from WRAL-TV.

Even before the fire department arrived, witnesses stated that it would have been impossible to gain entry and rescue anyone still inside, although firefighters initially made an unsuccessful attempt to do so. A home video camera recording taken from about a block away showed the house enveloped in flames as the first fire trucks could be heard arriving. Broadcast of the audio of the 911 calls and the home video on television news media and the Internet drew international publicity to the fire, as did photos of the devastation and interviews with eyewitnesses and community leaders in the aftermath.

== Victims ==
Six of the USC students were killed, as well as the student from Clemson University. Although families of those apparently killed were all notified of the likelihood of the deaths, the bodies were all taken to Chapel Hill, North Carolina for positive identification. The six survivors were all treated at a local hospital for various minor injuries, and released. One of the surviving students was hospitalized again later Sunday night in her hometown for the effects of smoke inhalation.

Late Tuesday afternoon, authorities officially identified the seven teenagers killed in the fire: Cassidy Fae Pendley, 18; Lauren Astrid Kristiana Mahon, 18; Justin Michael Anderson, 19; Travis Lane Cale, 19; Allison Walden, 19; William Rhea, 18—all students at the University of South Carolina. Emily Lauren Yelton, 19, was a student at Clemson.

Six of the thirteen students were able to escape the house with minor injuries. Andrew Rhea, 19, escaped the house but lost his younger brother William in the fire. Another survivor, Tripp Wylie, a 20-year-old University of South Carolina sophomore, said he jumped out of a third-story window into a canal to escape the flames but was unable to get back in to help his friends. Wylie was the only student on the upper level of the house to escape.

== Investigation ==
The cause of the fire was under investigation immediately afterwards by state and federal ATF teams. On October 29, the Ocean Isle Beach Mayor Debbie Smith reported to the news media that she had been told that the initial indications were that the fire had been accidental in origin, and that it probably had started somewhere near the rear of the home or deck at the western side of the house. The next day, ATF spokesman Earl Woodham confirmed that its agents ruled out arson, stating "There is no indication that this fire was deliberately set." The investigation was continuing as October 30.

Ocean Isle Beach Fire Department Chief Robert Yoho said the house might have been burning for as long as 20 minutes before any emergency personnel arrived. The morning of the fire was windy, apparently an aggravating factor in the quickness it spread. Yoho commented: "with the wind, it just basically feeds the fire." USC vice president of student affairs Dennis Pruitt later commented that the fact the house was built on stilts, which allowed air to fuel the flames and that it caught fire after a stretch of dry weather, was "a sad series of coincidences."

Later in the week, North Carolina's Chief Medical Examiner said smoke inhalation and carbon monoxide poisoning had killed all seven victims. "There was no evidence of any other injuries," Dr. John Butts told The Associated Press. It was explained to one parent that "they died in their sleep and not from the burns. He was told that the victims were all on the second floor and that they were all in their beds. In recalling the conversation with another medical examiner in Chapel Hill, the parent told a reporter: "She said it came very fast, that carbon monoxide comes before the smoke. She said they would have only taken just a few breaths of the carbon monoxide."

On November 2, agents from the North Carolina State Bureau of Investigation (NCSBI) and the federal Bureau of Alcohol, Tobacco, Firearms and Explosives (ATF) concluded their preliminary investigation of the fire scene. That afternoon, Ocean Isle Beach mayor Debbie Smith announced at a scheduled press conference that the investigation had failed to firmly establish the cause of the fire. She said it was determined that the fire started on the back deck of the three-level beach house, but the extensive damage made it impossible to say exactly what sparked the flames. Investigators specifically ruled out a grill and an outdoor fireplace, known as a chimney. However, investigators could not rule out that the fire started because smoking materials were improperly discarded, and there have been no reports of any other possible ignition sources, although investigators found absolutely no evidence of arson. A special agent of the NC-BCI told media sources that survivors reported that some of the students had been smoking cigarettes, but that no illegal drugs were at the house. In Columbia, South Carolina, WIS-TV made a copy of the Preliminary Report by North Carolina Bureau of Criminal Investigations available online.

== Aftermath ==
Ocean Isle Beach officials and citizens responded to the scene expressing both shock over unprecedented tragedy in the small community and offered concern and support to families and to other students. Between 35 and 50 students from the University of North Carolina had been staying at other homes close by for a service event of their fraternal organization, and had interacted socially with the occupants of the house that burned earlier in the weekend. Some of these students had witnessed the fire and aftermath.

At the end of the week, the burned-out house stood visible behind a safety fence. Nearby, an aluminum cross made by three area residents and surrounded by seven small crosses, one for each fire victim, was the centerpiece of an impromptu memorial of flowers and other items such as stuffed animals and personal notes of condolences were placed by residents and neighbors of Ocean Isle Beach and the surrounding community. Across North and South Carolina, and in Ohio, funeral and memorial services were held for those who died. In South Carolina, The State.com website created a memorial audio/slideshow presentation.

Upon learning of the disaster Sunday morning, a USC official flew to the scene to assist local authorities, students and families. Meanwhile, at Ocean Isle Beach, church leaders and social workers remained close by all day to offer grief counseling and other support as might be needed, even as the universities back in South Carolina prepared to do so as well. Other Ocean Isle Beach residents brought food and drinks to share with those working on the grim task of removing the victims and others handling duties on-site. Fire Chief Yoho said that counseling and support will also be made available for his firefighters, especially some of the younger ones involved in recovering the victims.

Local news media reported that the beach house was torn down the week of November 19. By Thanksgiving Day, all that was left at the scene was an empty, sand-filled lot.

== Response ==
Later Sunday, Andrew Sorensen, President of the University of South Carolina flew back to Columbia from an out-of state meeting in Washington, D.C., and held a press conference immediately upon arrival. He stated: "all members of the Gamecock Nation are saddened by the loss of six young lives" and he called for remembrance of the student from Clemson University who was killed as well.

Clemson University President James F. Barker issued a statement on Monday regarding the tragedy. "As the Clemson Family mourns the loss of one of our students we reach out to our sister institution, the University of South Carolina, in their loss," he said. "In our state all of us are connected and we feel their loss as they feel our loss. Our deepest sympathies are felt for the families of these seven students. We are working with our students and these grieving families to help them in the difficult days ahead."

Alumni and others affiliated with the Delta Delta Delta sorority and the Sigma Alpha Epsilon fraternity chapters involved as well as their national affiliates and other Greek fraternal groups were also mobilizing support, as were those in various home communities, as the word spread through non-official communications about the identities of those who died and those who had been injured but survived.

Through the Internet, and the Facebook service, by Sunday night, the news media reported that large volumes of communications and expressions of support and caring for the victims and families had been posted from websites all over the world. This was reported to be continuing as of November 2.

== Advocacy ==
Although smoke alarms were present and had activated, "the residence had no sprinkler nor alarm monitoring system," according to Mayor Debbie Smith at a press conference held by the Town of Ocean Isle Beach on November 2, confirming media reports. (That was later confirmed on November 16 by Dr. Butts, according to a news report of WYFF-TV Greenville, SC). During the previous week, there had been calls for changes in the building codes to require fire sprinkler system, particularly in larger capacity buildings frequently used by occasional guests, even though many of these are considered single-family dwellings under current regulations. Other suggestions included monitored electronic fire alarm systems which automatically notify authorities.

Mayor Smith said that she felt discussions and study of codes and standards will be the focus of considerable attention at Ocean Isle Beach in the immediate future. On Sunday, November 4, a memorial service for the seven students who died was held at Ocean Isle Beach Chapel. Hundreds attended. At that time, Mayor Smith stated:

"Our hearts are still with the victims and their families. This is certainly a tragedy we hope we never have to deal with again."

According to an Associated Press (AP) news story of November 10, the North Carolina Building Code Council was already reviewing a proposal to modify soffit materials for townhouses following another fire in Raleigh on February 22, 2007, caused by an improperly discarded cigarette that ignited pine needles and raced through the soffit and into the attic and destroyed 38 townhomes. (Soffit is the underside of a part of a building, such as an arch or overhang or beam). A draft report stated that current methods of townhouse construction have shown a potential to allow fire to spread along and through the soffit areas and into attic spaces. "In the specific instance of vinyl soffits, the soffit material can melt away and allow an open chase for flames to rapidly spread into the attic space," the draft said.

The AP reported that one member of the International Code Council, an association which develops the building codes used to construct residential and commercial buildings, including homes and schools in most U.S. cities, counties and states, stated that he had "received word that the Ocean Isle Beach fire ... began outside and raced through the soffit and into the attic."

One NC state code council member said it's too early to determine whether they will consider similar proposals for standalone homes, such as the one from the Ocean Isle Beach fire of October 28. "We look at every issue like this," he told The Sun-News of Myrtle Beach, South Carolina. "It's not something we're not going to look at."

=== Lobbying of Congress ===
On September 7, 2008, WIS-TV in Columbia, South Carolina reported that two of the survivors would be lobbying the U.S. Congress on behalf of two bills aimed at improving fire safety on college campuses nationwide. Ashley Perdue and Tripp Wylie each use the word "luck" to describe their circumstances during the fire which allowed them to survive.

The morning of the fire, Tripp Wylie was able to leap from a third story window and land in a canal, barely escaping the smoke and rapidly spreading fire which blocked other exits. Less than 48 hours later, he was interviewed by Matt Lauer in a live segment broadcast on NBC's The Today Show from his parents' home. He had known victims Travis Cale, Justin Anderson and Emily Yelton since grammar school, describing them as his best friends. Lauer inquired if Wylie was asking himself why he survived while his friends died. "You try to make sense out of it, which is impossible," Wylie replied. Ten months later, Wylie was still not sure why he survived and his friends did not. "It should not have to come down to luck," he told WIS-TV.

Perdue told WIS-TV. "Seeing so many families devastated just hurt me, having to go see, walk around campus and seeing everybody just devastated, I don't want anybody to feel that."

On September 9, Wylie and Perdue were joined by dozens of college students from South Carolina and North Carolina as they traveled to Washington. In addition to pushing for new legislation, the students said their trip was intended to raise awareness for fire safety and prevention on college campuses, declaring "Every student should know how to react if caught in a blaze like the fire at Ocean Isle Beach."
