= NCAA Division I Football Bowl Subdivision =

Top level of college football in the US

- Current season, competition or edition: 2026 NCAA Division I FBS football season
- Sport: College football
- Founded: 1978; 48 years ago
- No. of teams: 138
- Country: United States
- Most recent champion: Indiana Hoosiers (2025)
- Broadcasters: Various; College Football Playoff: ESPN/ABC; TNT/TBS/TruTV
- Website: ncaa.com/fbs

The NCAA Division I Football Bowl Subdivision (FBS), known as NCAA Division I-A prior to 2006, is the highest level of college football in the United States. Founded in 1978, the FBS consists of teams representing schools that are members of NCAA Division I, the highest division of competition sanctioned by the National Collegiate Athletic Association (NCAA). As of the 2026 season, there are 138 teams in the FBS. Most of the FBS member teams play in one of ten athletic conferences. There are also two FBS independents.

College football is one of the most popular spectator sports throughout much of the United States. The top schools generate tens of millions of dollars in yearly revenue. Top FBS teams draw tens of thousands of fans to games, and the fifteen largest American stadiums by capacity all host FBS teams or games. Since July 1, 2021, college athletes have been able to receive payments for the use of their name, image, and likeness. Prior to this date colleges were only allowed to provide players with non-monetary compensation such as athletic scholarships that provide for tuition, housing, and books.

Unlike other NCAA divisions and subdivisions, the NCAA does not officially award an FBS football national championship, nor does it host a playoff tournament to determine such a champion on the field. As the College Football Playoff did not exist until 2014, organizations such as the Associated Press (AP) and American Football Coaches Association (AFCA) have historically sought to rank the teams and crown a national champion, by taking a vote of sports writers and coaches, respectively. Various cities across the United States have created their own postseason contests, called bowl games, in which they traditionally invite teams to participate. Historically, these bowl games were mostly considered to be exhibition games involving a payout to participating teams. However, in the modern era, some of the bowls serve as quarterfinal or semifinal games of the Playoff and the remainder constitute the de facto postseason for teams that fail to qualify for the Playoff. The decades preceding the advent of the Playoff also included attempts by the premier FBS conferences and bowl games to attempt to organize matchups so that the FBS national championship was decided on the field, such as the Bowl Coalition from 1992 to 1994, the Bowl Alliance from 1995 to 1997, and the Bowl Championship Series from 1998 to 2013.

== Overview ==
List of schools with FBS teams per state as of 2026: One Two Three Four Five Six Seven Eight Thirteen

The FBS is the highest level of college football in the United States, and former FBS players make up the vast majority of the players picked in the NFL draft and active roster members. For every sport, the NCAA divides schools into three major divisions: Divisions I, II, and III. However, in football, Division I is further divided into two sub-divisions: the Bowl Subdivision, abbreviated as the FBS, and the Championship Subdivision, abbreviated as the FCS. Divisions are themselves further divided up into conferences, which are groupings of schools that play each other in contention for a conference championship. The FBS currently has ten conferences, which are often divided into the "Power Four conferences" – which consist of the most prestigious schools and enjoy a certain amount of autonomy from NCAA rules – and the less prominent "Group of Six". (Note: The Pac-12 Conference lost its autonomy status after all but two of its members left in advance of the 2024 NCAA Division I FBS football season. It was considered a de facto sixth member of the Group of Five in 2024, with the term changing to Group of Six in 2025.)

Although FCS programs can draw thousands of fans per game, many FCS schools attempt to join the FBS in hopes of increased revenue, corporate sponsorship, alumni donations, prestige, and national exposure. However, FBS programs also face increased expenses in regards to staff salaries, facility improvements, and scholarships. The athletic departments of many FBS schools lose money every year, and these athletic departments must rely on subsidies from the rest of the university. In many states, the highest-paid public employee is the head coach of an FBS team. Before the settlement of the House v. NCAA legal case took full effect in 2025–26, FBS schools were limited to a total of 85 football players receiving financial assistance. Since then, FBS programs have had a hard roster limit of 105, but all rostered players may receive full scholarships. Nearly all FBS schools that are not on NCAA probation give the full allowed scholarship allotment. The three United States service academies that are FBS members were technically subject to the 85-scholarship limit before House, but were effectively exempt because all of their students receive federally-funded full scholarships whether or not they play a varsity sport.

In order to retain FBS membership, schools must meet several requirements. Before 2023, FBS schools had to average at least 15,000 home attendance (over a rolling two-year period). An FBS school must sponsor a minimum of 16 varsity intercollegiate teams (including football), with at least six men's or coeducational teams and at least eight all-female teams. Across all sports, each FBS school must offer at least 200 athletic scholarships (or spend at least $4 million on athletic scholarships) per year, and FBS football teams must provide at least 90% of the maximum number of football scholarships (which is currently 85).

In October 2023, the NCAA announced major changes to FBS membership requirements. The average home attendance requirement, which had largely gone unenforced in the 21st century and was suspended in 2020 due to COVID-19 impacts, was permanently eliminated, effective immediately. Effective in 2027–28, minimums on both the total number of, and spending on, athletic scholarships in all FBS programs will be enforced. The number of required athletic scholarships will increase to 210, and the annual spending requirement rises to $6 million. Also starting in 2027–28, FBS programs must not only provide at least 90% of the required number of football scholarships, but must provide at least 90% of the maximum number of scholarships across a total of 16 sports, including football.

== Scheduling ==
The FBS season begins in late August or early September and ends in mid-January with the College Football Playoff National Championship game. Most FBS teams play 12 regular season games per year, with eight or nine of those games coming against conference opponents. (Note: With only eight football members in 2026, the Pac-12 Conference will play a single round-robin conference schedule, followed by a "flex game" between conference members that does not count in the conference standings.) All 10 FBS conferences hold a conference championship game to determine the winner of the conference. (Note: The Pac-12 will reinstate its championship game in 2026, with six new football-sponsoring full members having joined legacy members Oregon State and Washington State that July.)

New Year's Six Bowls
Bowl	Location	Est.
Rose Bowl	Pasadena, CA (Note: The 1942 Rose Bowl was played in Durham, North Carolina, and the 2021 Rose Bowl was played in Arlington, Texas.)	1902
Orange Bowl	Miami Gardens, FL	1935
Sugar Bowl	New Orleans, LA (Note: The 2006 Sugar Bowl was played in Atlanta, Georgia.)	1935
Cotton Bowl	Arlington, TX	1937
Peach Bowl	Atlanta, GA	1968
Fiesta Bowl	Glendale, AZ	1971

Following the conference championship games, 12 teams are selected to compete in the College Football Playoff, while other eligible teams are invited to bowl games. The top four seeds in the playoff receive a first-round bye, while the remaining eight teams compete in first-round games on campus sites. After the first round, the eight remaining playoff teams compete in the New Year's Six bowls, which rotate the responsibility of hosting quarterfinal and semifinal playoff games. The playoff culminates in the College Football Playoff National Championship.

The Hawaii Rainbow Warriors and teams that play at Hawaii get a special exemption and are allowed to play an extra regular season game in order to defray travel costs. Therefore, the longest possible FBS schedule is 18 games: 13 in the regular season, a conference championship game, and four playoff games.

For non-conference regular season games, FBS teams are free to schedule matchups against any other FBS team, regardless of conference. A small number of FBS teams are independent and have total control over their own schedule. Non-conference games are scheduled by mutual agreement and often involve "home and homes" (where teams alternate as hosts) and long-established rivalries. In order to balance out the difficulty of their in-conference schedules, teams from the stronger conferences frequently play non-conference games against teams from the weaker conferences or, occasionally, against FCS teams. FBS teams are free to schedule up to 40% of their games against FCS teams, but FBS teams can only use one win per season against an FCS team for the purposes of bowl eligibility. Additionally, the FCS opponent must have averaged at least 80% of the FCS limit of 63 scholarship equivalents over a rolling two-year period. (Before the 2022 season, this limit had been 90%. (Note: While the Ivy League prohibits athletic scholarships across all sports, the Pioneer Football League prohibits scholarships only in football, and Georgetown chooses not to offer football scholarships, wins against such schools may potentially count toward bowl eligibility. NCAA rules interpretations allow academic aid to count toward the 80% requirement. This issue came up in the 2017 season when Florida State was thought to be bowl-ineligible because one of its six wins that season was over Delaware State, a school that did not meet the then-current 90% requirement with football-related aid. However, once academic aid was counted, Delaware State met the threshold and FSU played in its bowl game.)) An FBS team must schedule a total of five home games per year; for the purposes of scheduling, a "home game" must take place at a venue in which the team plays 50% of its "home games", although a team is allowed to count one neutral-site game against an FBS team toward the "home game" requirement. FBS–FCS games, known as "money games", are often home games for the FBS team, and victories by FCS teams are considered to be upsets. FCS teams receive hundreds of thousands of dollars for their participation in these games.

Number of bowl games
Year	Bowls	Teams in bowls
1968	10	~17%
1984	18	~34%
1997	20	~35%
2015	41 (Note: 38 non-playoff bowl games, plus two playoff semifinal games in New Year's Six Bowls, plus the College Football Playoff National Championship)	62.5%
2024	46 (Note: 35 non-playoff bowl games, plus four first-round playoff games, plus six quarterfinal and semifinal playoff games in the New Year's Six Bowls, plus the College Football Playoff National Championship)	~61%

The Football Bowl Subdivision gets its name from the bowl games that many FBS teams play at the end of the year, although other college divisions also have their own bowl games. FBS bowl games are played at the end of the season in December or January. During the 2024–25 bowl season, there were 46 FBS bowl games, including four first-round College Football Playoff games and the College Football Playoff National Championship. An FBS team typically must have a record of 6–6 or better in order to be bowl eligible. In certain cases – usually if not enough teams have such records – 5–7 and 6–7 teams can also be selected to bowls.

Many bowls have one or more conference tie-ins; for example, the Pop-Tarts Bowl provides a matchup between teams from ACC and the Big 12. A small number of long-established bowls played a major role in the Bowl Championship Series, which was used to select the national champion until the 2013 season, and these bowls continue to play a major role in the College Football Playoff. In addition to payouts to participating teams, conferences receive millions of dollars for each school that appears in the playoff. Appearances in other bowls are also quite lucrative. In addition to the regular bowls, some postseason games, such as the Senior Bowl, match up teams of all-stars and NFL draft entrants.

== History ==
The original FBS proposal in 1975:
Atlantic Coast Conference
Big Eight Conference
Big Ten Conference
Pac-8 Conference
SEC
Southwest Conference
Western Athletic Conference
Independents

College football has been played for over one hundred years, but the game and the organizational structure of college football have evolved significantly during that time. The first college football game was played in 1869, but the game continued to develop during the late 19th and early 20th century. During this period, Walter Camp pioneered the concept of a line of scrimmage, the system of downs, and the College Football All-America Team. The 1902 Rose Bowl was the first bowl game in college football history, and the event began to be held annually starting with the 1916 Rose Bowl. In the 1930s, other bowl games came into existence, including the Sugar Bowl, the Cotton Bowl Classic, and the Orange Bowl. The 1906 college football season was the first season played under the IAAUS (which would later change its name to the NCAA) and the first season in which the forward pass was legal. The IAAUS had formed after President Theodore Roosevelt, responding to several deaths that had occurred during football games, requested that colleges find ways to make football a safer sport.

NCAA Football Average Attendance
Conf.	1983	1993	2003	2014	2025
SEC	64,842	62,789	74,059	77,694	79,717
Big Ten	67,471	63,535	70,198	66,869	64,477
Big 12	—	—	56,362	58,102	49,988
Pac-12	47,248	47,919	51,608	52,702	28,475 (Note: In 2024 and 2025, the Pac-12 had only two members (Oregon State and Washington State), and the NCAA did not list a conference average. Attendance figures for all FBS programs were provided in both seasons.)
ACC	42,608	44,056	51,938	50,291	48,491
American (Note: Includes numbers for the Big East in 1993 and 2003.)	—	38,039	46,870	29,193	25,021
MW	—	—	32,809	25,254	24,871
CUSA	—	—	32,346	20,455	13,603
Sun Belt	—	—	14,352	18,294	21,573
MAC	17,351	14,252	17,820	15,431	14,169
FBS	42,162	41,281	44,877	44,603	41,727
FCS	10,844	8,599	7,739	8,310	7,752

In 1935, the Heisman Trophy was presented for the first time; the award is generally considered to be college football's most prestigious individual award. In 1965, the NCAA voted to allow the platoon system, in which different players played on offense and defense; teams had previously experimented with the concept in the 1940s. In 1968, the NCAA began allowing freshmen to compete in games; freshmen had previously been required to take a redshirt year. In 1975, after a growth of "grants-in-aid" (scholarships given for athletic rather than academic or need-based reasons), the NCAA voted to limit the number of athletic scholarships each school could offer. In 1968, the NCAA required all teams to identify as members of either the University Division (for larger schools) or the College Division (for smaller schools), and in 1973, the NCAA divided into three divisions. At the urging of several larger schools seeking increased autonomy and commonality, Division I-A was formed prior to the 1978 season; the remaining teams in Division I formed the Football Championship Subdivision or FCS (then known as Division I-AA). In 1981, members of the College Football Association attempted to create a fourth division consisting solely of the most competitive schools, but this effort was defeated. In the 1992 season, the SEC split into divisions and played the first FBS conference championship game. The Big 12 and Western Athletic Conference did the same for the 1996 season, and most conferences eventually adopted divisions and championship games.

The NCAA does not officially award an FBS football championship, but several teams have claimed national championships. Other organizations have also sought to rank the teams and crown a national champion. The Dickinson System and other methods were formed in the early 20th century to select the best team in the country, and the AP Poll and the Coaches Poll began rankings teams in the middle of the 20th century. In many seasons, selectors such as the AP and the Coaches Poll designated different teams as national champions. Often, more than one team would finish undefeated, as the top teams were not guaranteed to play each other during the regular season or in bowl games. In 1992, five major conferences established the Bowl Coalition in order to determine the FBS champion. In 1998, the two remaining major conferences joined with the other five conferences to form the Bowl Championship Series. The BCS used a rankings system to match up the top two teams in the BCS National Championship Game. However, even the BCS era saw split national championships, as in 2003 the AP Poll and the Coaches Poll selected different national champions. The College Football Playoff replaced the BCS starting with the 2014 season; it featured four teams through the 2023 season, after which it expanded to 12 teams.

Since 2021, when the Supreme Court unanimously held in NCAA v. Alston that restrictions on name, image, and likeness compensation violated antitrust law, FBS football players have been able to make money from sources other than college scholarships. However, there remains no unified system to provide players with such compensation.

=== AP Poll performance by team ===
Key

- CH National Champion
- RU National Runner-up
- T4 Top 4 finish
- T8 Top 8 finish
- T16 Top 16 finish
- T25 Top 25 finish

Please note that the exact ranking is shown for each school outside of the national champions and runner-up.

School	Conference	#	T16	T8	T4	T2	CH	36	37	38	39	40	41	42	43	44	45	46	47	48	49	50	51	52	53	54	55	56	57	58	59	60	61	62	63	64	65	66	67	68	69	70	71	72	73	74	75	76	77	78	79	80	81	82	83	84	85	86	87	88	89	90	91	92	93	94	95	96	97	98	99	00	01	02	03	04	05	06	07	08	09	10	11	12	13	14	15	16	17	18	19	20	21	22	23	24	25
Alabama	SEC	63	58	41	24	16	12	4	4	13			20	10			3		6			16		9	13						10	9	CH	5	8	CH	CH	3	8	17			4	7	4	5	3	11	RU	CH	CH	6	7		15		13	9		17	9		5	CH	14	5	21	11			8			11			8			6	CH	10	CH	CH	7	4	CH	RU	CH	RU	8	CH	RU	5	5	17	9
Notre Dame	Independent	61	52	32	20	14	8	8	9	5	13		3	6	CH	9	9	CH	CH	RU	CH			3	RU	4	9		10	17	17					3	9	CH	5	5	5	RU	13	14	CH	6		12	CH	7		9							17	CH	RU	6	13	4	RU		11	19		22		15		17			9	17						4	20		11		11	5	12	5	8	18	14	RU	10
Oklahoma	SEC	63	57	42	26	10	7			4	19							14	16	5	RU	CH	10	4	4	3	CH	CH	4	5	15			8	10				3	11		20	RU	RU	3	CH	CH	5	7	3	3	3	20	16		6	CH	3	3	14		17	16		17							CH	6	5	3	3	22	11	8	5		6	16	15	6		5	5	3	4	7	6	10		15		13
Ohio State	Big Ten	65	61	40	25	14	6		13		15		13	CH		RU	12				6	14		17		CH	5	15	RU	8		8	RU			9				CH	4	5		9	RU	4	4	6	11		4	15	15	12	9	13	14	7			24			18	11	14	6	RU	12	RU				CH	4	20	4	RU	5	9	5	5		3	12	CH	4	6	5	3	3	RU	6	4	10	CH	5
USC	Big Ten	52	41	26	18	10	5			7	3					7	11		8					5		17	13	18			14			CH		10	10		CH	4	3	15	20	CH	8	RU	17	RU	13	RU	RU	11	14	15		10			18	7	8	20				13	12							4	CH	CH	RU	4	3	3	22		6		19	20		3	12			21		12			20
Miami	ACC	35	26	16	12	10	5															15				11	14	6										9														18	8		CH	18	9	RU	CH	RU	CH	3	CH	3	15	6	20	14		20	15	RU	CH	RU	5	11	17				19							20	13			22				18	RU
Nebraska	Big Ten	48	39	24	11	6	4	9	11		18	7										17													6	6	5	6			11	CH	CH	4	7	9	9	9	12	8	9	7	11	3	RU	4	11	5	6	10	11	24	15	14	3	CH	CH	6	RU	19	3	8	8		19		24				14	20	24	25													
Minnesota	Big Ten	15	12	7	4	4	4	CH	5	10		CH	CH	19						16	8							12				CH	6	10																																					18				20																10						
Georgia	SEC	44	37	26	13	6	3						14	RU			18	3		8											5							4		8			7				19	10		16		CH	6	4	4				13	15			17	8					10	14	16	20	22	3	7	7	10	23	RU	13			19	5		9			RU	7	4	7	CH	CH	4	6	6
LSU	SEC	44	38	20	9	6	3	RU	8								15	8			9									CH	3		4	7		7	8			19	10	7	11	11	13									11		15	20	10	5	19								12	13			22	7		RU	16	6	3	CH		17	8	RU	14	14		16	13	18	6	CH			16	12		
Texas	SEC	53	43	24	17	5	3						4	11	14		10	15	5			3		10	11				11		4		3	4	CH	5				3	CH	3	18	3	14	17	6		4	9	12		RU	17	5							12				25	14	23		15	21	12	5	6	12	5	CH	13	10	4	RU			19						9	25	19		25	3	4	12
Michigan	Big Ten	65	53	34	14	5	3			16	20	3	5	9	3	8	6	6	RU	CH	7	9			20	15	12	7								4				12	9	9	6	6	6	3	8	3	9	5	18	4	12		8		RU	8	19	4	7	7	6	5	21	12	17	20	CH	12	5	11	20	9	6	14		8	18				12	24			12	10	14	18			3	3	CH		21
Florida State	ACC	35	29	20	14	5	3																																										14		6	5		13		17	15		RU	3	3	4	4	RU	CH	4	4	3	3	3	CH	5	15	21	11	15	23			21		17	23	10	CH	5	14	8						11	6		
Clemson	ACC	38	26	10	7	5	3				12									11		10	19					19		12	11																		19	6			CH	8	11			17	12	9	12	9	18		23							16			22		21		21		24		22	11	8	15	RU	CH	4	CH	RU	3	14	13	20	14	
Florida	SEC	34	29	16	8	4	3																	15					17	14	19	18									14					15									6	3	5					13	7	10	5	7	RU	CH	4	5	12	10	3		24		12	CH	13	CH	3			9			25	14		7	6	13					
Tennessee	SEC	47	35	21	12	6	2	17		RU	RU	4	18	7		12	14	7			17	4	CH	8				RU	13								7		RU	13	15	4	9	8	19	20											4		14		5	8	14	12	12	22	3	9	7	CH	9		4		15	13		25	12								22	22						6	17	9	
Penn State	Big Ten	46	38	23	11	5	2							19					4	18						20					12	16		9					10	RU	RU	18	5	10	5	7	10		5	4	20	8	3	CH			3	CH			15	11	3		8	RU	13	7	16	17	11			16			3	24		8	9							7	8	17	9			7	13	5	
Auburn	SEC	40	32	15	7	4	2							16											17	13	8		CH	4		13			5					16	20	10	12	5		8					16			14	3	14		6	7	8	6	19			4	9	22	24	11			18		14		RU	14	9	15			CH			RU	22		24	10		14						
Army	American	16	11	8	6	4	2								11	CH	CH	RU	11	6	4	RU			14	7	20		18	3																																						25																						19						21	
Pittsburgh	ACC	21	15	9	6	3	2	3	CH	8																	11	13			20				4												15	CH	8		7	RU	4	10	18						17													19		25					15												13	22			
Michigan State	Big Ten	28	26	14	8	5	1													14	19	8	RU	CH	3		RU	9	3			15	8		9		RU	RU								12				12									8		16	16									7									24		14	11		3	5	6		15				9				
TCU	Big 12	22	17	9	4	3	1	16	16	CH													11				6	14		10	7																																									21		23	25		11	22		7	6	RU	14			3	7		9					RU			25
Colorado	Big 12	20	14	7	4	1	1		17																			20					7								16		3	16			16	16													4	CH	20	13	16	3	5	8					9	20														17								25	
Maryland	Big Ten	18	12	5	3	1	1														14		3	13	CH	8	3																		20	13	13	8		20				20		12	18																11	13	17							23															
Indiana	Big Ten	8	5	3	3	1	1										4	20																					4												19									20																																12				10	CH
Texas A&M	SEC	29	22	10	2	1	1				CH	6	9														17	5	9																	16	11	7		19							6	13	10		20	15	12	7	9	8	15		20	11	23											19		5	18					16		4					8
Syracuse	ACC	16	10	4	2	1	1																	14				8		9	CH	19																											4	13			11	6			19	21	21	25			14																	15						20	
BYU	Big 12	21	13	3	1	1	1																																										20		13	12	13		7	CH	16				22	22	23			18		5					25					16	14	25	12											11	19			13	11
Oregon	Big Ten	22	17	10	7	3	–													9																																														11	18				19	7	RU				12		23	10	11	3	4	RU	9	RU	19				5		22	15	6	3	4
Washington	Big Ten	28	22	11	5	3	–	5				10			12							11									8	6											19						10		11	16	10	7		RU		18			23	5	RU	11				16	18			3	19												25			4	16	13				8	RU		
Navy	American	15	9	7	5	2	–	18					10		4	4	RU									5	18	16	5			4			RU																																									24											18				20						23
Ole Miss	SEC	29	22	10	4	2	–						17						13	15				7		6	10		7	11	RU	RU	5	3	7						8	20	15																			21		16					22		22				13					14	20					17	10						11		9	11	3
Georgia Tech	ACC	24	17	9	3	2	–				16			5	13	13		11	10				5	RU	8		7	4										8				13		20													19					RU							25	9	20	17	24							22	13					8											
UCLA	Big Ten	32	27	14	4	1	–				7			13				4					17	6	5	RU	4										4	5			13			15	12		5	15		14		13		5	17	9	7	14	9	6			19		18				5	8							16								16	10								21			
Wisconsin	Big Ten	26	20	11	3	1	–							3									8	11	15	9			19	7	6			RU																															6					6	4	23				17	15	7	24		16	7	10		22	13	21	9	7		11						
Arkansas	SEC	29	26	10	3	1	–	18	14									16								10					9	7	9	6		RU	3			6	7	11	16				7		3	11	8			9			12	15		12	13									16	17							15				12	5										21				
Iowa	Big Ten	29	19	8	3	1	–				9														9			3	6	RU		3																					18		14	16	10	16	16			18	10				25	18						8	8	8				20	7						9			25	15	16	23		24		17
Stanford	ACC	20	15	7	3	1	–					RU		12									7		19		16														19	8	10						15	17													22	9									16									4	7	7	11		3	12	20								
Arizona State	Big 12	18	14	7	3	1	–																						12													6	8	13	9		RU		18				16	6				4	20									4	14							19			16						21	12										7	
California	ACC	14	12	5	3	1	–		RU	14									15	4	3	5	12							16																	14																8		25											9	25	14																			
Duke	ACC	16	11	4	2	1	–	11	20	3	8	18	RU		7	11	13		19					16	18	14			16			10																																																					23												
SMU	ACC	13	10	4	2	1	–					16							3	10										18								10		14												20	5	RU	12	8																																							22	12	
Utah	Big 12	12	7	2	2	1	–																																																											10									21	4				RU	18					21	17	23			16		12	10			14
Virginia Tech	ACC	20	12	3	1	1	–																			16																																20							22		10	13		23	RU	6	18	18		10	7	19	9	15	10	16	21					16	24								
Iowa Pre-Flight	WWII Military	2	2	2	1	1	–								RU	6																																																																																	
Illinois	Big Ten	14	11	4	2	–	–									15		5				13	4		7						13				3																				10						10	25									24		12						20																	16	
Missouri	SEC	20	11	8	1	–	–				6		7								20										18	5					6			9	6				17					15			19																23	21									4	19		18			5	14									8	22	
Oklahoma State	Big 12	17	12	4	1	–	–										5													19																		14								7			11	11									24											16		13	3		17		20	11	14			20	7		16		
Boise State	Pac-12	14	10	4	1	–	–																																																																			15	16	12		5		11	4	9	8	18		16			22	23	23					8	
Houston	Big 12	16	8	3	1	–	–																																	18	12	19	17		9	19		4		10	5									18	14	10																					18				8						17				22
Oregon State	Pac-12	11	6	3	1	–	–						12															10								8			7	15																																4						21	25	18				20										17			
Cincinnati	Big 12	8	3	3	1	–	–																																																																								17	17	8		25							24	21	8	4				
North Carolina	ACC	17	11	2	1	–	–		19									9	9	3	16																							12					17		15	10	9	18										19	19			10	6																		15					18					
South Carolina	SEC	11	7	2	1	–	–																							15																										11			15													19	13									22	9	8	4									23		19	
Fordham	FCS	6	5	2	1	–	–	15	3	15	17	12	6																																																																																				
Arizona	Big 12	8	4	1	1	–	–																																								18											11			25				10	20				4																19									11		
Cornell	FCS	5	4	1	1	–	–			12	4	15								19	12																																																																												
Tulsa	American	8	3	1	1	–	–							4	15		17	17				18		12																																							21																			24															
Randolph Field	WWII Military	1	1	1	1	–	–									3																																																																																	
Kansas State	Big 12	15	9	4	–	–	–																																																										20	19	7	17	8	10	6	9		7	14								15	12		18								14	18		
West Virginia	Big 12	20	8	4	–	–	–																		10	12	19														17						20						17	19	16					5	21				7									25			5	10	6	23	25		17					18		20							
Northwestern	Big Ten	13	8	4	–	–	–	7		17		8	11		9					7																																															8	15																17			23		17	21		10					
Boston College	ACC	14	6	3	–	–	–				11	5		8																																									19	5		19						21	13	23							21			21	18	20	10																		
Rice	American	7	4	3	–	–	–		18									10	18		5				6	19			8																																																																				
Baylor	Big 12	16	13	2	–	–	–														20		9			18		11				12														14					14	14					17	12																									13		13	7	13				13		5				
Purdue	Big Ten	16	8	2	–	–	–								5									18						13		19						7	9	10	18									13	10	17																	15	24	25	13			18																						
Kentucky	SEC	10	6	2	–	–	–														11	7	15	20	16																							18	6							19																																		12			18				
Penn	FCS	7	6	2	–	–	–	10				14	15		20		8	13	7																																																																														
Louisville	ACC	12	5	2	–	–	–																																					18																		14			24								17			6	19	6						13	15	24		21							19		
Kansas	Big 12	8	5	2	–	–	–												12													11								7					18																			22			9												7																23		
Air Force	Mountain West	7	5	2	–	–	–																							6												16													13		8						25							13																					22						
Tulane	American	9	4	2	–	–	–			19	5									13		20																				17			20																									7																								9			18
Princeton	FCS	4	2	2	–	–	–														18	6	6	19																																																																									
Texas Tech	Big 12	12	6	1	–	–	–			11															12																				11			13													19						23									18	20		22	12	21																7
Santa Clara	Defunct	6	6	1	–	–	–	6	9		14	11		15							15																																																																												
Dartmouth	FCS	5	4	1	–	–	–	13	7	20					16																											14																																																							
UCF	Big 12	5	3	1	–	–	–																																																																											21			10				6	11	24						
Wyoming	Mountain West	4	3	1	–	–	–															12									16								6																													22																													
Duquesne	FCS	3	3	1	–	–	–	14			10		8																																																																																				
Villanova	FCS	3	2	1	–	–	–		6	18											13																																																																												
Bainbridge Naval	WWII Military	2	1	1	–	–	–									5	17																																																																																
Great Lakes Navy	WWII Military	2	1	1	–	–	–								6	17																																																																																	
Carnegie Mellon	D3	1	1	1	–	' –	–			6																																																																																							
Saint Mary's	Defunct	1	1	1	–	–	–										7																																																																																
Del Monte	WWII Military	1	1	1	–	–	–								8																																																																																		
Washington State	Pac-12	12	7	–	–	–	–						19	17									18																					19																16				15		21			9				10	10	9															10							
Mississippi State	SEC	15	6	–	–	–	–					9	16	18															14																	17		20				19												23		24					13	24										15				11			19					20			
Miami (OH)	MAC	5	5	–	–	–	–																				15																		15	10	12																												10																						
NC State	ACC	15	4	–	–	–	–											18	17										15															17	16	11				18													24	17		17								12								25							23				20		21		
Virginia	ACC	10	4	–	–	–	–																13																																	20					18	23				15	16			18				22		23																					16
Yale	FCS	4	4	–	–	–	–	12	12									12														14																																																																	
Holy Cross	FCS	5	3	–	–	–	–		14	9				19			16						19																																																																										
Iowa State	Big 12	4	2	–	–	–	–																																									19																								25																				9				15	
Utah State	Pac-12	4	2	–	–	–	–																										10																																																			16						22			24				
Toledo	MAC	4	2	–	–	–	–																																			12	14																								24						23																								
Vanderbilt	SEC	4	2	–	–	–	–													12																																																																23	24												15
William & Mary	FCS	3	2	–	–	–	–							14					14	17																																																																													
Colorado State	Pac-12	3	2	–	–	–	–																																																											16			17			14																									
March Field	WWII Military	2	2	–	–	–	–								10	10																																																																																	
Louisiana	Sun Belt	2	2	–	–	–	–																																																																																					15	16				
Wake Forest	ACC	5	1	–	–	–	–										19			20																																												25														18															15				
Rutgers	Big Ten	3	1	–	–	–	–																							20																		17																														12																			
Southern Miss	Sun Belt	3	1	–	–	–	–																																																														19		14												20														
Marshall	Sun Belt	3	1	–	–	–	–																																																																10			24												23											
San Diego State	Pac-12	3	1	–	–	–	–																																										16																																							25					25				
East Carolina	American	2	1	–	–	–	–																																																20								9																																		
Pacific	Defunct	2	1	–	–	–	–								19						10																																																																												
Nevada	Mountain West	1	1	–	–	–	–																																																																											11															
Georgetown	FCS	1	1	–	–	–	–					13																																																																																					
Norman	WWII Military	1	1	–	–	–	–									13																																																																																	
Coastal Carolina	Sun Belt	1	1	–	–	–	–																																																																																					14					
San Francisco	Defunct	1	1	–	–	–	–																14																																																																										
Western Michigan	MAC	1	1	–	–	–	–																																																																																	15									
Boston University	Defunct	1	1	–	–	–	–																16																																																																										
El Toro	WWII Military	1	1	–	–	–	–									16																																																																																	
Fresno State	Pac-12	4	–	–	–	–	–																																																									24												22														18				24			
Memphis	American	4	–	–	–	–	–																																																																															25			25		17					24	
Hawaii	Mountain West	2	–	–	–	–	–																																																									20															19																		
Columbia	FCS	2	–	–	–	–	–										20		20																																																																														
South Florida	American	2	–	–	–	–	–																																																																																	19	21								
Liberty	CUSA	2	–	–	–	–	–																																																																																					17			25		
San Jose State	Mountain West	2	–	–	–	–	–																																																																													21								24					
George Washington	Defunct	1	–	–	–	–	–																					17																																																																					
Hardin–Simmons	D3	1	–	–	–	–	–					17																																																																																					
New Mexico State	CUSA	1	–	–	–	–	–																									17																																																																	
Temple	American	1	–	–	–	–	–																																												17																																														
Colorado College	Defunct	1	–	–	–	–	–								18																																																																																		
Fort Pierce	WWII Military	1	–	–	–	–	–									18																																																																																	
Washington and Lee	D3	1	–	–	–	–	–															18																																																																											
Appalachian State	Sun Belt	1	–	–	–	–	–																																																																																				19						
Delaware	CUSA	1	–	–	–	–	–											19																																																																															
James Madison	Sun Belt	1	–	–	–	–	–																																																																																										19
Lafayette	FCS	1	–	–	–	–	–					19																																																																																					
Saint Mary's Navy	WWII Military	1	–	–	–	–	–									19																																																																																	
Troy	Sun Belt	1	–	–	–	–	–																																																																																							19			
Second Air Force	WWII Military	1	–	–	–	–	–									20																																																																																	
Marquette	Defunct	1	–	–	–	–	–	20																																																																																									
Ohio	MAC	1	–	–	–	–	–																																	20																																																									
VMI	FCS	1	–	–	–	–	–																						20																																																																				
Northern Illinois	Mountain West	1	–	–	–	–	–																																																																													22													
Ball State	MAC	1	–	–	–	–	–																																																																																					23					
Bowling Green	MAC	1	–	–	–	–	–																																																																				23																						
Central Michigan	MAC	1	–	–	–	–	–																																																																										23																
UNLV	Mountain West	1	–	–	–	–	–																																																																																									23	
North Texas	American	1	–	–	–	–	–																																																																																										24
Western Kentucky	CUSA	1	–	–	–	–	–																																																																																24										
Buffalo	MAC	1	–	–	–	–	–																																																																																					25					

== Television ==
College football was first broadcast on radio in 1921, and first broadcast on television in 1939. Television became profitable for both schools and the NCAA, which tightly controlled the airing of games in the 1950s, 1960s, and 1970s. The NCAA limited each football team to six television appearances over a two-year period. The 1981 Supreme Court case NCAA v. Board of Regents of the University of Oklahoma & University of Georgia granted television rights to individual schools as opposed to the NCAA and allowed teams to televise all of their games. After a period during which FBS schools negotiated collectively under the College Football Association, Notre Dame's 1991 television contract with NBC ushered in an era in which schools and conferences negotiate their own television contracts. This new era of television led to several waves of conference realignment, most notably in 1996, 2005, the early 2010s, and the first half of the 2020s. FBS games continue to be a major draw on television, as over 26 million people watched the 2014 BCS National Championship Game.

National networks such as CBS, ABC, NBC, several ESPN networks, and several Fox networks have all covered the FBS, as have several regional and local networks. As conferences negotiate their own television deals, each conference is affiliated with a network that airs its home games. In the mid-2000s, college and conferences began to create their own television networks; such networks include the Big Ten Network, BYUtv, the Longhorn Network (which was folded into the SEC Network in 2024), and the Pac-12 Network. In 2012, college football games drew over 400 million viewers.

== Teams and conferences ==
=== Conferences ===
FBS teams and conferences
Year	Conferences	Teams
1980	13	138
1982 (Note: This figure includes the two conferences that were Division I-A/Division I-AA hybrids, but does not include the I-AA schools in the member count.)	10	96
1990	9	107
2000	11	116
2010	11	120
2020	10	130
2026	10	138

==== History ====
The Big Ten (then popularly known as the Western Conference) was founded in 1896, after which several other schools joined to form conferences, including the Pacific Coast Conference, the MVIAA, the Southwest Conference, the Southern Conference, the Mountain States Conference (also known as the Skyline Conference), and the Border Conference. In 1928, six schools seceded from the MVIAA to form the Big Six Conference, which later expanded to the Big Eight in 1957; the remaining schools formed the Missouri Valley Conference. In 1932, several Southern schools formed the SEC after breaking away from the Southern Conference, and in 1953 several more schools seceded from the Southern Conference to form the ACC. In 1946, several Midwestern schools formed the MAC. Several elite Northeastern schools had formed the Eastern Intercollegiate Basketball League in 1901, and its members (plus Brown University, not an EIBL member at the time) signed the Ivy Group Agreement, which governed football competition between the signatories, in 1945; the Ivy League was formally founded in 1954, when the agreement was extended to cover all sports. In 1959, the Pacific Coast Conference dissolved, and most of its former members formed the new Athletic Association of Western Universities, which became the Pac-8 when more former PCC members joined. In 1962, several schools from the Mountain States Conference and the Border Conference formed the Western Athletic Conference. In 1969, the Pacific Coast Athletic Association (PCAA), later known as the Big West Conference, was formed by several Division II California schools that sought to join Division I.

Division I separated into Division I-A (the predecessor to the FBS) and I-AA (predecessor of the FCS) prior to the 1978 season. At that time, there were several independent I-A schools and twelve Division I-A conferences: the Southeastern Conference (SEC), Big Ten, Pacific-10 (Pac-10), Big 8, Southwest Conference (SWC), Western Athletic Conference (WAC; now the United Athletic Conference), PCAA (which later changed its name to the Big West), Missouri Valley Conference, Southern Conference, Atlantic Coast Conference (ACC), Mid-American Conference (MAC), and the Ivy League. The Ivy League and the Southern Conference left for Division I-AA prior to the 1982 season, while the Missouri Valley Conference stopped sponsoring football prior to the 1985 season. In 1991, the Big East recruited several independents and began sponsoring football, becoming a major conference. In 1996, Conference USA (CUSA), formed the previous year by the merger of the non-football Metro and Great Midwest Conferences, also began sponsoring football. That same year, the Southwest Conference dissolved, and four of its former members joined with the Big 8 to form the Big 12 Conference. In 1999, eight schools broke away from the WAC to form the Mountain West Conference (MW). Prior to the 2000 season, the Big West stopped sponsoring football. The Sun Belt Conference (SBC) began sponsoring football in 2001. After periods of conference realignment in 2005 and the early 2010s that saw the expansion of the ACC, Big Ten, SEC, and Pac-10 (which changed its name to the Pac-12), the WAC reorganized as a non-football conference and the Big East split into the American Athletic Conference, now known as the American Conference, and a new non-football conference that retained the Big East name.

==== Current conferences ====
Most of the 138 FBS schools are members of an FBS conference, but there are also a small number of independent schools. Since the Western Athletic Conference discontinued football sponsorship prior to the 2013 season, there have been ten conferences in the FBS. Through the 2023 season, all of the FBS conferences had between 10 and 14 members, although independent Notre Dame has a scheduling agreement with the then-14-member ACC. The ten conferences are split into two groups for the purposes of the College Football Playoff. The "Power Four conferences" consist of most of the largest and best-known college athletic programs in the country. A school from one of the power conferences (including the Pac-12, which was a power conference prior to 2024) won every BCS National Championship Game (which operated from 1999 to 2014), and has won every College Football Playoff National Championship. The remaining six conferences are known as the "Group of Six". Any conference may split its teams into two divisions; however, since the 2024 season, the only FBS conference that uses divisions is the SBC. The American, the Big 12, and CUSA all previously utilized division systems before abandoning them after losing some of their member schools to realignment: UConn left the American in July 2020, and Marshall, Old Dominion, and Southern Miss left CUSA in July 2022, leaving both those conferences with an odd number of members, while the Big 12 has not used divisions since the early-2010s conference realignment left it with 10 members. The Pac-12, however, chose to abandon divisions entirely as a result of the NCAA Division I Council ruling that conferences would no longer be required to maintain divisions in order to hold a conference championship. It was the first conference to entirely abandon divisions due to this, with the ACC and MW announcing similar intentions for 2023, and the Big Ten, MAC, and SEC doing the same for 2024. Since the 2018 season, all conferences have held a championship game that determines the conference champion. The Sun Belt was the last conference to launch a championship game, as well as the most recent to split into divisions for football, with both the title game and the divisional alignment debuting in 2018. That conference chose to form football divisions despite having only 10 football members; it has since expanded to 14 members while maintaining its divisional alignment.

Conference	Nickname	Founded	Football Members (Note: Numbers are as of the upcoming 2026 football season.)	Sports	Headquarters
American Conference	American	1979 (Note: The conference was founded in 1979 as the original Big East Conference. It renamed itself the American Athletic Conference following a 2013 split along football lines. The non-FBS schools of the original conference left to form a new conference that purchased the Big East name, while the FBS schools continued to operate under the old Big East's charter and structure. The American also inherited the old Big East's Bowl Championship Series berth for the 2013 season, the last for the BCS. The word "Athletic" was dropped from the conference name in July 2025.)	14 (Note: Army and Navy are football-only members, and Wichita State is a full member that does not sponsor football.: 15 football members no later than 2028 with addition of James Madison.)	20	Irving, Texas
Atlantic Coast Conference†	ACC	1953	17 (Note: Notre Dame is a full member except in football, in which it remains independent. Through the 2026 season, it has committed to play at least five games each season against ACC opponents, and to play each other ACC member at least once every three years. From 2027 on, the overall five-game commitment remains in place, but the rotation has been revamped to give Notre Dame more games against the conference's most prominent football brands, namely Clemson, Florida State, and Miami.)	27	Charlotte, North Carolina
Big 12 Conference†	Big 12	1996	16	25	Irving, Texas
Big Ten Conference†	Big Ten, B1G	1896	18	28	Rosemont, Illinois
Conference USA	CUSA	1995 (Note: The conference was founded in 1995, with football competition starting in 1996.)	10	19	Dallas, Texas
Mid-American Conference	MAC	1946	13 (Note: 12 full members and 13 football members, with Sacramento State as a football-only member.)	24	Cleveland, Ohio
Mountain West Conference	MW (official); MWC (informal)	1999	10 (Note: 10 full members and 10 football members. Among full members, Grand Canyon does not play football at all, and UC Davis plays FCS football. North Dakota State is a football-only member, and Northern Illinois houses football and women's gymnastics in the MW.)	21	Las Vegas, Nevada
Pac-12 Conference	Pac-12	1915 (Note: The charter of the Pac-12 dates only to the formation of the Athletic Association of Western Universities (AAWU) in 1959. However, the Pac-12 claims the history of the Pacific Coast Conference, which was founded in 1915 and began competition in 1916, as its own. Of the nine members of the PCC at the time of its demise in June 1959, four were charter members of the AAWU, with a fifth joining before the "new" conference started play, and three of the four others joined the AAWU by 1964; only Idaho never joined the Pac-12. The PCC's berth in the Rose Bowl passed to the AAWU.)	8 (Note: 8 football members, plus Gonzaga as a full but non-football member.)	20	San Ramon, California
Southeastern Conference†	SEC	1932	16	22	Birmingham, Alabama
Sun Belt Conference	SBC (official) Sun Belt (unofficial)	1976	14 (Note: 13 members no later than 2028 with loss of James Madison.)	19	New Orleans, Louisiana
Independents (Note: "Independents" is not a conference; it is simply a designation used for schools whose football programs do not play in any conference. All of these schools have conference memberships for other sports.)	—N/a		2	—N/a	

† "Big Four" or "Power Four" conferences that enjoy "autonomy status" under NCAA rules

=== Transitional teams ===
==== Recently transitioned teams ====
Georgia Southern University in Statesboro, Georgia, joined the Sun Belt Conference upon transitioning to the FBS level in 2014. Prior to joining the Sun Belt, GASOU won six FCS (I-AA) national championships and have produced two Walter Payton Award winners. The Eagles first continuously fielded a football team in 1924; however, play was suspended for World War II and revived in 1981. The Eagles competed as an FCS independent from 1984 until 1992 as the Eagles' main conference at the time, the Trans America Athletic Conference (now known as the Atlantic Sun Conference, or ASUN), did not sponsor football, and as a member of the Southern Conference from 1993 until 2013, winning 10 SoCon championships.

The Georgia Southern Eagles finished their first FBS season 9–3 overall and was undefeated in Sun Belt Conference play at 8–0; winning the Sun Belt Conference championship outright in its first year as an FBS member. They were also the first team ever to go unbeaten in conference play in their first FBS season. Since the Eagles were under transitional status, the university filed for a postseason waiver to allow the Eagles to play in a bowl game; however, the NCAA denied Georgia Southern's waiver request and a subsequent appeal since enough full member FBS teams became bowl-eligible during the season.

Liberty University began its FBS transition process on July 1, 2017. The NCAA granted the school a waiver from its normal transition rules that require an invitation from an FBS conference before beginning the transition. The Flames played in the Big South Conference in 2017 but were not eligible for the FCS playoffs. For 2018 to 2022, the Flames became an FBS independent. The school initially intended to remain a Big South member in other sports until it received an invitation to an FBS conference, but instead joined the non-football ASUN Conference in 2018. Conference USA (CUSA) eventually announced in November 2021 Liberty's future addition to that conference, with Flames football moving to CUSA starting in the 2023 season.

Three schools began FBS transitions on July 1, 2022, James Madison University, Jacksonville State University, and Sam Houston State University. James Madison joined the Sun Belt after meeting the NCAA minimum of five FBS opponents at its home stadium, as required and scheduled. This happened after James Madison's FCS conference, the all-sports Colonial Athletic Association (CAA), (Note: Since renamed the Coastal Athletic Association.) barred the Dukes from competing in or hosting team championships in any sport for that conference during the 2021–22 season according to then-current CAA bylaws. (The CAA football league, branded as CAA Football, is technically a separate entity from the all-sports CAA.) However, the Dukes were eligible for at-large bids to all NCAA team championships in 2021–22. By meeting FBS scheduling requirements in 2022, JMU played an FBS schedule in year one of their transition process, which normally only occurs in the 2nd year of two-year transition process. Due to that, JMU tried to become bowl eligible in 2023, but the NCAA refused it. However, when only 79 non-transitional FBS teams were available to fill the 82 FBS bowl slots for that season, JMU, which had finished its regular season with an 11–1 record, was allowed to fill one of the vacant slots. On July 1, 2023, the two other outgoing FCS teams, Jacksonville State and Sam Houston joined Conference USA. The Kennesaw State University Owls started its transition in 2023 ahead of its 2024 move to Conference USA.

The most recent programs to have completed an FBS transition are the Delaware Fightin' Blue Hens and the Missouri State Bears, which began their transitions in 2024 and joined Conference USA for the 2025 season.

==== Current transitional teams ====
Two schools started transitions from FCS on July 1, 2026, thereby becoming the 137th and 138th FBS programs. Both joined FBS conferences as football-only members, and house the bulk of their other sports in non-football conferences. The North Dakota State Bison, otherwise a member of the Summit League, joined Mountain West football, and the Sacramento State Hornets, which moved the bulk of their sports to the Big West Conference in July 2026, joined MAC football. Both programs' two-year transitional process will be completed in 2028.

== Finances ==
The following table shows revenue for each conference reported for the fiscal year beginning 2024 ending 2025 as reported by ProPublica using Schedule A of each conference's tax filings.

Conference	2024–25 Total Revenue	2024–25 Total Number of Members	2024–25 Average Revenue Per Member	2024–25 Conference Distribution to Each Member
Big Ten Conference	$1,372,758,005	18	$76,264,334	2024-25 Distributions
Southeastern Conference	$1,027,767,904	16	$64,235,494	2024-25 Distributions
Atlantic Coast Conference	$736,617,636	18	$40,923,202	2024-25 Distributions
Big 12 Conference	$557,030,984	16	$34,814,437	2024-25 Distributions
Pac-12 Conference	$58,522,466	2	$29,261,233	2024-25 Distributions
Mountain West Conference	$103,380,648	12	$8,615,054	2024-25 Distributions
American Conference	$126,769,924	15	$8,451,328	2024-25 Distributions
Conference USA	$41,862,748	10	$4,186,275	2024-25 Distributions
Mid-American Conference	$34,573,609	12	$2,881,134	2024-25 Distributions
Sun Belt Conference	$24,307,113	14	$1,736,222	2024-25 Distributions

== Realignment ==
The FBS has experienced several realignments since its formation in 1978, with many teams changing conferences, dropping out of the FBS, or moving up from the FCS. In 1982, the size of the division was cut considerably, and the Southern Conference and the Ivy League were demoted to the FCS. In 1985, the Missouri Valley Conference stopped sponsoring football. In the 1980s and 1990s, several independents joined conferences, dropped football, or joined the FCS. In the 1996 NCAA conference realignment, the Southwest Conference dissolved, and four Texas teams from that conference joined with the Big 8 schools to form the Big 12 Conference. The Western Athletic Conference expanded to sixteen members, but half of the schools left in 1999 to form the Mountain West Conference. Conference USA (CUSA) formed from a merger of the Metro Conference and the Great Midwest Conference, two conferences which had not sponsored football. The Big West stopped sponsoring football after the 2000 season, and was essentially replaced by the Sun Belt Conference, which added former Big West members and began sponsoring football in 2001. In the mid-2000s, the Big East added former basketball-only member Connecticut, while Temple left the conference (before eventually returning in 2013). During another phase of realignment in 2005, three schools jumped from the Big East to the ACC. The Big East responded by adding schools from Conference USA.

College football underwent another major conference realignment in the first half of the 2010s. Members of the Big East left the conference to join the Big 12 and ACC. The Big 12 lost members to the SEC, the Pac-12, and the Big Ten, while the Big Ten also gained one former ACC member. The remaining members of the Big East split into two conferences: the American Athletic Conference ("American": since renamed the American Conference) and a new conference that assumed the Big East name but does not sponsor football. The American added several schools from CUSA, but lost one school each to the ACC and Big Ten after its first season. In turn, CUSA added FCS schools and schools from the Sun Belt Conference. The Sun Belt Conference replenished its membership by adding FCS schools and schools from the Western Athletic Conference. The Mountain West lost schools to the Big 12, Pac-12, and the FBS independent ranks, and added several schools from the WAC. After several defections, leaving the conference with only two football-sponsoring schools remaining, the WAC dropped its sponsorship of football.

The early-2010s realignment cycle also affected the FBS independent ranks. BYU left the MW in 2011 for football independence and the non-football West Coast Conference. In 2013, Idaho and New Mexico State, the last two football-sponsoring schools in the WAC, became FBS independents, but would return to their former football home of the Sun Belt Conference as football-only members the following year. Also in 2013, Notre Dame became a full but non-football member of the ACC, entering into a scheduling agreement with that conference that calls for the Fighting Irish football team to play five games each season against ACC schools, and to play each other ACC school at least once every three years. Finally, in 2015, Navy became a football-only member of the American, ending more than a century of football independence.

Realignment continued at a lower level through the rest of the 2010s and into the early 2020s. Georgia Southern joined the Sun Belt Conference upon transitioning to the FBS level in 2014. The Eagles won the Sun Belt Conference championship outright in their first year as an FBS member. The 2016 season saw FCS Coastal Carolina join the Sun Belt Conference for non-football sports while beginning a transition to FBS football; the football team joined the Sun Belt in 2017. That season was also the last for Idaho and New Mexico State as Sun Belt football members. After 2017, New Mexico State returned to independent status, while Idaho downgraded to FCS football—becoming the first program ever to voluntarily do so without extenuating circumstances (Note: When the NCAA demoted the Ivy League and Southland Conference to Division I-AA after the 1981 season due to not meeting then-current football attendance requirements, McNeese (Southland) and Yale (Ivy), both of which had met said requirements, chose to follow their conferences into I-AA (now FCS).)—and added football to its all-sports membership in the Big Sky Conference. Also in 2016, UMass went independent after turning down an offer of full membership in the Mid-American Conference. More recently, UConn went independent in 2020 when the school left the American to rejoin many of its historic basketball rivals in the current Big East Conference. Notre Dame competed under a full ACC schedule only also in 2020 in response to logistical concerns that arose from the effects of COVID-19.

The most recent realignment is currently ongoing, with the majority of conference changes in this cycle taking place in 2023 and 2024. It started with the announcements by Oklahoma and Texas that they would leave the Big 12 for the SEC no later than 2025. The Big 12 and its departing members later announced a 2024 departure date. The first actual conference changes came in 2022, with the Sun Belt gaining Marshall, returning Old Dominion, and Southern Miss from CUSA, and FCS upgrader James Madison. The following year saw CUSA add Jacksonville State, Sam Houston (both from FCS), New Mexico State and Liberty (FBS independents) but lose Charlotte, Florida Atlantic, North Texas, Rice, UAB, and UTSA to the American. In turn, the American lost Cincinnati, Houston, and UCF to the Big 12, which also added former football independent BYU. In 2024, Oklahoma and Texas joined the SEC, while 10 of the 12 members of the Pac-12 left for other power conferences—UCLA, USC, Oregon, and Washington for the Big Ten; Arizona, Arizona State, Colorado, and Utah for the Big 12; and California and Stanford for the ACC. In addition, Kennesaw State upgraded to FBS and joined CUSA, SMU left The American for the ACC, and Army left the independent ranks to become a football-only member of the American. 2025 also saw two new teams transition from FCS to FBS as Delaware and Missouri State joined CUSA, respectively from CAA Football and the Missouri Valley Football Conference (MVFC), and also the departure of UMass from the independent ranks to become a full member of the MAC. In September 2024, the Pac-12 started a rebuilding process by raiding the Mountain West Conference, with five MW members (Boise State, Colorado State, Fresno State, San Diego State, and Utah State) set to join the Pac-12 in 2026. The MW first responded by announcing that UTEP would join from CUSA in 2026, soon followed by Hawaiʻi upgrading its MW membership from football-only to all-sports in 2026. Two other schools would later join for football only, also effective in 2026—Northern Illinois from the MAC (later adding women's gymnastics to its MW membership), and 10-time FCS champion North Dakota State joining from the MVFC. The Pac-12 gained the eighth full football-sponsoring member it needed to maintain its FBS status when it announced Texas State would join from the SBC in 2026. The SBC responded by inviting former member Louisiana Tech, which had left the SBC immediately before the conference's first football season in 2001, to join no later than 2027; after a legal dispute over the terms of Tech's departure from CUSA, the parties reached a settlement that allowed Tech to rejoin the SBC in 2026. The MAC would later respond to the loss of Northern Illinois by adding Sacramento State as a football-only member starting in the 2026 season. Also in 2026, the American announced that James Madison, already a conference member in two women's sports, would become a full member no later than 2028.

== Awards ==
Several awards are given each year to players and coaches in the FBS. Although all college football players are eligible for many of these awards (such as the Heisman Trophy), FBS players usually win these awards, and other awards (such as the Walter Payton Award) exist to honor players in other divisions and the FCS. In addition to the national awards listed below, FBS conferences also have their own awards, and several organizations release a yearly College Football All-America Team. In 1951, the National Football Foundation established the College Football Hall of Fame. Notable individual awards include:

- Best/most valuable player: Heisman Trophy, Maxwell Award, Walter Camp Award, Archie Griffin Award, AP Player of the Year, SN Player of the Year, Lombardi Award (originally lineman/linebacker, but expanded to all players in 2016)
- Defensive player of the year: Chuck Bednarik Award, Bronko Nagurski Trophy, Lott Trophy
- Position awards: Dave Rimington Trophy (Center), Davey O'Brien Award and Manning Award (Quarterback), Dick Butkus Award (Linebacker), Doak Walker Award (Running back), Fred Biletnikoff Award (Wide receiver), Jim Thorpe Award (Defensive back), John Mackey Award (Tight end), Lou Groza Award (Placekicker), Outland Trophy (Interior lineman), Ray Guy Award (Punter), Ted Hendricks Award (Defensive end), Jet Award (Return Specialist)
- Non-positional playing awards: Paul Hornung Award (most versatile player), Burlsworth Trophy (top player who began his college career as a walk-on), Jon Cornish Trophy (top Canadian player)
- Coaching awards:
  - Head coaches: AFCA Coach of the Year, Eddie Robinson Coach of the Year, SN Coach of the Year, Walter Camp Coach of the Year Award, Paul "Bear" Bryant Award, Home Depot Coach of the Year Award, AP Coach of the Year
  - Assistants: Broyles Award, AFCA Assistant Coach of the Year
- Other awards: William V. Campbell Trophy, Wuerffel Trophy, Rudy Award, Amos Alonzo Stagg Award, Walter Camp Man of the Year, Theodore Roosevelt Award

The NCAA does not officially name a national champion, but several other organizations name national champions and all conferences participate in the College Football Playoff in order to determine a champion. The winner of the College Football Playoff receives the College Football Playoff National Championship Trophy. The AP awards the AP National Championship Trophy, while the American Football Coaches Association awards the AFCA National Championship Trophy. The AFCA trophy was previously awarded to the winner of the BCS National Championship Game (a predecessor of the College Football Playoff National Championship game), which operated from 1999 to 2014. The Football Writers Association of America awarded the Grantland Rice Trophy until after the 2013 season, and the National Football Foundation awards the MacArthur Bowl. Since the disputed end of the 2003 season, the various organizations have been able to agree on a single national champion.

== Maps of teams ==
Many of the school names on the maps below are abbreviated in order to save space.
The following is a list of such abbreviations along with each school's full name:

- App State : Appalachian State University
- BC : Boston College
- BGSU : Bowling Green State University
- BSU : Ball State University
- BU : Boston University
- BYU : Brigham Young University
- CCU : Coastal Carolina University
- CMU : Central Michigan University
- CSUF : California State University, Fullerton
- CSULB : California State University, Long Beach
- ECU : East Carolina University
- EMU : Eastern Michigan University
- EK : Eastern Kentucky University
- FAU : Florida Atlantic University
- FIU : Florida International University
- GW : George Washington University
- JMU : James Madison University
- JSU : Jacksonville State University
- LA Tech : Louisiana Tech University
- LSU : Louisiana State University
- MTSU : Middle Tennessee State University
- NIU : Northern Illinois University
- NMSU : New Mexico State University
- NYU : New York University
- ODU : Old Dominion University
- PSU : Penn State University
- SDSU : San Diego State University
- SJSU : San Jose State University
- SMU : Southern Methodist University
- TCU : Texas Christian University
- TXST : Texas State University
- UAB : University of Alabama at Birmingham
- UCF : University of Central Florida
- UCLA : University of California, Los Angeles
- UConn : University of Connecticut
- ULM : University of Louisiana at Monroe
- UMass : University of Massachusetts Amherst
- UNC : University of North Carolina at Chapel Hill
- UNLV : University of Nevada, Las Vegas
- USC : University of Southern California
- USF : University of South Florida
- UTSA : University of Texas at San Antonio
- VMI : Virginia Military Institute
- W&J : Washington & Jefferson College
- W&L : Washington and Lee University
- W&M : College of William & Mary
- WFU : Wake Forest University
- WKU : Western Kentucky University
- WMU : Western Michigan University
- WUSTL : Washington University in St. Louis
- WVU : West Virginia University

=== 1927 map of teams ===
College football teams in 1927:
Big Ten Conference
Missouri Valley Intercollegiate Athletic Association (before six teams left to form the Big 6 which grew into the Big 8)
Pacific Coast Conference (which grew into the Pacific-10)
Rocky Mountain Athletic Conference
Southern Conference
Southwest Conference
Independents

=== 1956 map of teams ===
College football teams in 1956:
Atlantic Coast Conference
Big 7 Conference (which grew into the Big 8)
Big Ten Conference
Border Intercollegiate Athletic Association
Ivy League
Missouri Valley Conference
Pacific Coast Conference (which grew into the Pacific-10)
Skyline Conference
Southern Conference
SEC
Southwest Conference
Independents

=== 1976 map of teams ===
College football teams in 1976:
Atlantic Coast Conference
Big Eight Conference
Big Ten Conference
Ivy League
Mid-American Conference
Missouri Valley Conference
Pac-8 Conference
PCAA (aka Big West Conference)
Southern Conference
SEC
Southwest Conference
Western Athletic Conference
Independents

=== 1982 map of teams ===
NCAA Division I-A football in 1982:
Atlantic Coast Conference
Big Eight Conference
Big Ten Conference
Big West Conference
Mid-American Conference
Missouri Valley Conference
Pacific-10 Conference
Southeastern Conference
Southwest Conference
Western Athletic Conference
Independents
Notes:
- Hawaii, a member of the WAC, is not shown.
- The Missouri Valley Conference was a hybrid of NCAA Division I-A and I-AA programs; only I-A members are shown.
- Eight of the ten members of the Mid-American Conference were relegated to Division I-AA for the 1982 but they successfully appealed and were returned Division I-A for the 1983 season.
- Cincinnati, then an independent, was relegated to Division I-AA for the 1982 season. They successfully appealed and returned to Division I-A status for the 1984 season.

=== 1991 map of teams ===
NCAA Division I-A football in 1991:
Atlantic Coast Conference
Big East Conference (1979-2013)
Big Eight Conference
Big Ten Conference
Big West Conference
Mid-American Conference
Pacific-10
SEC
Southwest Conference
Western Athletic Conference
Independents other than those indicated below
Independents that joined an AQ conference by the BCS's inaugural 1998 season (plus Notre Dame, which also automatically qualified for the BCS under certain conditions).

Notes:
- This was one year before the start of the Bowl Coalition.
- Hawaii, a member of the WAC, is not shown.

=== 2010 map of teams ===
NCAA Division I-A football in 2010:
Atlantic Coast Conference
Big East Conference (1979-2013)
Big 12 Conference
Big Ten Conference
Conference USA
Mid-American Conference
Mountain West Conference
Pacific-10
SEC
Sun Belt Conference
Western Athletic Conference
Independents

Notes:
- Hawaii, a member of the WAC, is not shown.

=== 2026 map of teams ===
NCAA Division I FBS football in 2026:
American Conference
Atlantic Coast Conference
Big 12 Conference
Big Ten Conference
Conference USA
Mid-American Conference
Mountain West Conference
Pac-12 Conference
SEC
Sun Belt Conference
Independents

Notes:
- Hawaii, a member of the MW, is not shown.

=== Schools that have transitioned to the FBS ===
This map shows schools that have transitioned to the FBS since 1978.
Schools that transitioned before 1990
Schools that transitioned between 1990 and 1999
Schools that transitioned between 2000 and 2009
Schools that transitioned between 2010 and 2019
Schools that transitioned in 2020 or later
Idaho, a school that has transitioned from FCS to FBS (1997) and back to FCS (2018).

== FBS programs ==
In addition to the list of FBS football programs in the Main article, there is also a List of NCAA Division I FBS football stadiums.

== See also ==
- Power conferences
- Group of Six conferences
- NCAA Division I Football Championship Subdivision
- List of NCAA Division I non-football programs
