= 2010–2013 Mountain West Conference realignment =

2010–2013 realignment of the Mountain West Conference

The 2010–13 Mountain West Conference realignment refers to the Mountain West Conference (formally abbreviated as MW since July 2011; also MWC) dealing with several proposed and actual conference expansion and reduction plans among various NCAA conferences and institutions from 2010 to 2013. Moves that involved the MW were part of a much larger NCAA conference realignment in which the MW was one of the more impacted conferences. During this period, four schools that had been members at the beginning of the realignment cycle announced plans to join other conferences, and six schools announced plans to join the conference (five as all-sports members, and one for football only). Two schools—one a pre-2010 member, and the other joining during the cycle—had announced their upcoming departure, but later decided to stay in the MW.

== Background ==
In 1996, the Western Athletic Conference (WAC) took advantage of the demise of the Southwest Conference (SWC) to expand from 10 members to 16, bringing in new members from the SWC, Big West Conference, and Missouri Valley Conference. This arrangement, however, proved to be less than satisfactory to most of the pre-1996 members, as the conference now spanned from Hawaii to Oklahoma—a distance of about 3,900 miles (6,300 km) and four time zones. As a result, the presidents of five of the pre-1996 members—the United States Air Force Academy (Air Force), Brigham Young University (BYU), Colorado State University, the University of Utah, and the University of Wyoming—met at Denver International Airport in 1998 and decided to form a new league. They invited two fellow pre-1996 members, the University of New Mexico and San Diego State University, plus a 1996 WAC arrival, the University of Nevada, Las Vegas (UNLV), to join them in the new Mountain West Conference, which began play in 1999.

During another major round of realignment in 2005, Texas Christian University (TCU) joined, seeing the MWC as an upgrade from its then-current home of Conference USA (C-USA).

The early-2010s wave of realignment began in 2010, after both the Big Ten Conference and Pacific-10 Conference (now Pac-12) announced plans to expand to 12 members. These moves triggered a cascade of conference moves, with the Mountain West as a significant center of movement.

== First moves: Boise State joins, Utah leaves ==
The Mountain West, which had previously announced that their plans for expansion were on hold for a potential expansion including Boise State, announced on June 11, 2010, in advance of a July 1 deadline for WAC teams to withdraw from their conference, that Boise State had joined the conference, and would begin play for the 2011–2012 season. Speculation at the time indicated that the conference would continue to expand if the Big 12 Conference, then the center of realignment activity, dissolved. This development presumably would have boosted the MWC's hopes of securing an automatic bid to college football's lucrative Bowl Championship Series. If Texas, Texas Tech, Oklahoma, and Oklahoma State had left the Big 12 to join the Pac-10 (either with Texas A&M joining them in the move, or making a separate move to the Southeastern Conference), presumably a fatal blow to the Big 12, the MWC would likely attempt to add any combination (or all) of the remaining Big 12 teams (Baylor, Iowa State, Kansas, Kansas State, Missouri).

With the decision of the Big 12's Texas and Oklahoma public schools to stay in that conference, the Mountain West then became an expansion target itself, with the Pac-10 reportedly focusing on Utah. On June 16, 2010, ESPN announced that the Pac-10 had extended an invitation to Utah to join the conference and the Utes accepted the following day.

== Departure of BYU, addition of Fresno State and Nevada ==
The June 2010 activity proved to be only the beginning of movement in the Mountain West. On August 18, Andy Katz of ESPN.com, citing multiple sources, reported that BYU was considering leaving the MWC to become an independent in football, while its other sports would rejoin the WAC. According to Katz' sources, BYU was stunned that it did not receive an invitation during the earlier conference shuffle, and the school wanted to further differentiate itself from its archrival Utah. More to the point, some saw the school as a potential "Notre Dame of the West". A follow-up report from Katz later that day indicated that such a move was likely, with one source saying, "I'm not sure how it could stop now unless BYU gets nervous." On August 31, the school announced it would indeed leave the MWC in all sports, becoming independent in football, as expected, but would instead join the West Coast Conference in all other sports starting with the 2011–12 academic year.

BYU and Notre Dame share some key similarities. Both are religiously affiliated schools—BYU with the Church of Jesus Christ of Latter-day Saints (LDS Church), and Notre Dame with the Catholic Church. Both also have their own television affiliations, with BYU owning a cable channel and Notre Dame having its own network deal with NBC. With BYU's move to football independence, its arrangement with the WCC was similar to Notre Dame's then-current status as a non-football member of the Big East Conference (although unlike the Big East, the WCC does not sponsor football). Katz reported that BYU was in discussions with ESPN for its football rights.

These reports were not the first to involve a possible affiliation change by BYU; local media in Utah had reported in 2007 that BYU had long considered going independent in all sports, but ultimately decided against it. Rumors regarding a potential BYU conference change returned in July 2010, when BYU athletic director Tom Holmoe said that the school would consider going independent in football in the wake of not being invited in the earlier conference shuffle. He told reporters at that time, "We have a national base. We can go all over the country and people can see that. That is a very important thing to us right now — exposure." The story, bubbling under the surface for several weeks, erupted when hackers reportedly broke into the Twitter account of the athletic department of another MWC member, Colorado State, and said that an announcement of BYU's plans was imminent, leading the Salt Lake Tribune to publish Holmoe's remarks on August 18.

While Katz' first report indicated that such a move by BYU was unlikely unless it gets access to the BCS similar to that of Notre Dame, his follow-up report noted that this was not a major concern for the school, and that BYU was well aware that it would not likely receive a similar arrangement to Notre Dame from the BCS. BYU had to receive approval for its move from the leadership of the LDS Church, which presumably occurred.

In the wake of BYU's potential move, the MWC responded the same day by inviting WAC members Utah State, Fresno State and Nevada to move to the MWC. The MWC also reportedly studied the feasibility of inviting Houston and UTEP, then in Conference USA. By the end of the day, Utah State declined while Fresno State and Nevada accepted the MWC's invitations.

The one stumbling block to the departures of Nevada and Fresno State was a buyout provision agreed to by the remaining WAC schools after Boise State's departure. Under its terms, any school leaving the conference in the next five years must pay a $5 million buyout. All reports indicated that Fresno State had signed the agreement, but reports varied as to whether Nevada had done so. Reports also began to surface that BYU might reconsider leaving the MWC, and ESPN also reported that the West Coast Conference had shown interest in inviting BYU's non-football sports.

The WAC buyout agreement, however, included a number of provisions that were initially considered likely to spark legal action.

- The agreement specifically states, "In the event that no written agreement [to join the WAC] is executed by BYU on or before Sept. 1, 2010 ... then this resolution is terminated."
- The agreement reportedly called for only the first school that left the WAC to be penalized. Since Fresno State and Nevada announced their departures at essentially the same time, Fresno State claimed it owed at most half of the $5 million. Nevada claimed it owed nothing.

Although not at issue in the context of Fresno State and Nevada, it is also of note that the agreement also allowed any WAC school to leave for a conference that has an automatic BCS berth without penalty, and the WAC had long said that Louisiana Tech (at that time the WAC's geographically easternmost member) would be free to leave the conference if it received an invitation from C-USA (where it would be closer to many of its similarly situated rivals).

Ultimately, the two schools and the WAC came to a settlement, with Fresno State and Nevada agreeing to remain in the conference through the 2011–12 academic year in exchange for a reduced exit fee.

Nevada's move also put them in the same conference as their in-state rivals, the UNLV Rebels, for the first time since the 1995–96 academic year, in which they were both part of the Big West Conference. As such, this move made the Battle for the Fremont Cannon all the more significant.

At that time, Utah State had been rumored to have changed its mind since originally declining its invitation, and once again actively sought acceptance into the Mountain West. The Aggies featured solid programs in both men's and women's basketball, and also fit in well with the MWC's geographic footprint. Had BYU stayed in the MWC, Utah State's presence would have given the Cougars a new in-conference local rival to supplement their historic rivalry with Utah. With BYU's departure confirmed, Utah State would secure the state's media market for the MWC.

== Hawaiʻi joins for football, TCU leaves ==
On November 19, media reports indicated that the University of Hawaiʻi at Mānoa (Hawaiʻi or UH) was nearing a deal to join the MWC for football only, with the remainder of its sports joining the Big West Conference—a league which was once home to the school's women's sports. With respect to the MWC, UH system president M. R. C. Greenwood stated in a news conference, "We have a handshake but we have yet to agree on the details." On December 10, Hawaiʻi accepted football-only membership in the MWC, beginning with the 2012 season. It placed the bulk of its other sports in the Big West.

Hawaiʻi began seriously looking at its options, including going independent, once Fresno State and Nevada left the WAC. With two schools on or near the West Coast leaving the conference, ultimately being replaced by two Texas schools, travel costs became an increasing concern for Hawaiʻi. The MWC football move would enable the Warriors to maintain a number of existing regional rivalries. The school's other sports, and its athletic budget, were seen as likely to benefit from a move to the Big West; because all of the then-current BWC members were in California and either in or near the Los Angeles and Bay Areas (with the exception of Cal Poly), Hawaiʻi could reach all of its conference opponents by flying only to those two metropolitan areas. The application of CSU Bakersfield and UC San Diego for BWC membership alongside Hawaiʻi did not significantly change the equation, with only the San Diego area added as a potential flight destination. Neither of the latter two schools were invited (they would eventually join in 2020). As a part of the agreement that brought Hawaiʻi into the Big West, the school would provide an annual total of about $500,000 in travel subsidies to other conference members. However, Hawaiʻi was not required to provide any subsidy to schools that joined the Big West after 2012.

The overtures toward Hawaiʻi were at least partially driven by the prospect that TCU would receive an invitation to the Big East Conference, which ultimately came on November 29. Following TCU's impending departure, several current Conference USA members in Texas, especially Houston alongside either UTEP or SMU, as well as WAC member Utah State, were seen as potential MWC targets. In the end, TCU never joined the Big East, instead accepting an invitation from the Big 12 Conference in October 2011. The latter conference is home to several of the Horned Frogs' former Southwest Conference rivals. The Big 12 added TCU in part because Texas A&M had announced a move to the Southeastern Conference. Additionally, TCU's Fort Worth campus is also in the same metropolitan area as the Big 12 headquarters.

In January 2011, rumors spread that the MWC was considering further expansion. In addition to Utah State (for the second time) and the aforementioned C-USA schools in Texas, San Jose State emerged as a possible candidate. The MWC's board of directors met in Las Vegas on January 23 with expansion on the agenda, although no invitations were expected to be issued. On January 25, the board issued a statement unequivocally denying any interest in further expansion.

== Attempted alliance with Conference USA and two new members ==
On October 14, 2011, Conference USA and the MW announced they would enter into a football-only alliance, forming a 22-team league. The league would span 15 states and 5 time zones.

The two conferences entered into talks on a full merger, and media reports in February 2012 indicated that a merger was imminent. However, financial issues resulting from provisions of NCAA rules scuttled the proposed merger, and the two conferences were reported to have entered into the originally planned football alliance (which in the end never materialized after both conferences added several new members). In May of that year, WAC members San Jose State and Utah State announced that they would join the MW in 2013.

== Boise State reconsiders ==
At about the same time that San Jose State and Utah State were announced as the MW's newest members, CBS Sports reported that Boise State was reconsidering its decision to join Big East football. The school had not yet formally withdrawn from the MW; under league bylaws, it was only required to give one year's notice. According to the report, possible concerns for Boise State were:

- The uncertain future of the WAC, where the school planned to place its non-football sports. Boise State's concerns about the WAC were serious enough that Idaho's main daily newspaper, the Idaho Statesman, reported that the school asked the Big East for help in placing its non-football sports.
- The Big East's status in the BCS setup was in flux due to the elimination of automatic qualification for BCS bowls starting in 2014. Specifically, it was unknown whether the conference would receive revenue at the level of a current AQ conference, or at a lower level.
- Because almost $8 billion had been spent on recent college football TV deals, industry sources believed that the next Big East TV deal, to be renegotiated starting September 1, would be worth substantially less than the $155 million per year that the conference turned down in April 2012.

Because Boise State signed a contract to join Big East football, it would have been required to pay an exit fee of $5 million if it decided to stay in the MW. The school waited until the last possible date of June 30 to officially notify the MW of its departure. It paid an exit fee of $2.5 million, which would have risen to $7.5 million had it waited any longer. At the same time, Boise State announced that they were in discussions to place their other sports (except wrestling) into the Big West Conference rather than the WAC, and expected a vote by the Big West presidents by the start of the 2012 academic year. Like Hawaii, they would be required to help the other schools defray their extra travel costs, and the Big East was expected to contribute some of this money.

== Boise State remains in MW ==
As the Big Ten Conference was in the midst of its November 2012 wave of expansion, ESPN reported that Boise State, BYU, and San Diego State were all in talks to rejoin the Mountain West. The trigger for these talks was the decision of the BCS commissioners to award an automatic BCS bowl berth, beginning in 2014, to the highest-ranked champion of the so-called "Group of Five" conferences—the MW, Big East, C-USA, Mid-American Conference, and Sun Belt Conference.

The Big Ten expansion, and its effect on the Big East, gave these talks even greater significance. At the time of the ESPN report, the Big East was confirmed to be losing Rutgers to the Big Ten, and within days would lose Louisville to the Atlantic Coast Conference. Boise State and San Diego State had planned to join the Big East for football because of the promise of more TV money, but the loss of two members was seen as likely to cause a significant revenue loss.

When the MW announced earlier in the year that it would add San Jose State and Utah State, it explicitly said that it did not expand beyond 10 football schools in hopes that Boise State and San Diego State would return. However, all three potential returnees faced significant financial obstacles to a MW return. Boise State and San Diego State each reportedly faced a $10 million Big East exit fee — although Boise State's buyout was subject to reduction if the Big East's new TV contract did not meet certain revenue goals, a scenario that became more likely with the announced exit of the seven Big East schools that do not play Division I FBS football. As for BYU, it would have needed to get out of a TV contract with ESPN that was worth about $4 million annually through 2018. BYU would also not be assured of the same level of revenue in the MW (or Big East), although it would get better bowl game access.

On December 22, 2012, after the Big East's non-FBS schools announced their departure, ESPN reported that Boise State was playing off the Big East and MW in an attempt to retain TV rights to its home football games. At the time (and now), no school in an FBS conference retained its home TV rights. One TV industry source indicated that at least one of the conferences might allow this arrangement, but both conferences and several other industry sources disagreed. Another source said that Boise State was the "lynchpin" (sic) as to whether the Big East or MW would survive.

The December ESPN report indicated that if Boise State opted to stay in the MW, the conference would then seek to add a 12th football member for 2014. As San Diego State then appeared to be committed to Big East football, the likeliest candidates for that slot were seen as incoming Big East members Houston and SMU and C-USA members Tulsa and UTEP. For its part, the Big East had reached out to four schools as potential football members—MW members Air Force, Fresno State, and UNLV, plus football independent BYU. However, Air Force and BYU were said to be content with their current situations, and the other two schools reportedly had no interest in a Big East without Boise State.

On December 31, Boise State announced it had decided to stay in the MW, leaving the Big East, much like TCU, without ever playing a game in it. Boise State decided to remain in the MW because of that conference's geographic proximity and the Big East's continued instability. While the school's attempted TV rights power play was not successful, it did gain several concessions from the MW. Rights to the Broncos' home games would be sold in a separate package from the league's primary contract with CBS Sports Network. As a part of the deal, any MW member (not just Boise State) that appears on ESPN, ESPN2, or broadcast networks ABC, CBS, or NBC could receive a bonus of $300,000, with an extra $200,000 for a Saturday game. Also, beginning in 2014, if an MW team appeared in a BCS-sponsored bowl game—either the four-team national playoff expected to begin at that time (ultimately known as the College Football Playoff), or one of the so-called "access bowls" (one of which has a guaranteed spot for a "Group of Five" team)—the revenue from that game would be split 50-50 between the participating school and the conference. Finally, the MW removed its previous uniform restrictions on Boise State, allowing it to once again wear its standard home blue uniforms in conference games at Bronco Stadium, famous for its blue playing surface.

== San Diego State follows suit ==
With Boise State staying in the Mountain West, it was reported that San Diego State would indeed try to rejoin the Mountain West as well. San Diego State's contract with the Big East allowed that school to leave without penalty if there were no other member schools west of the Rockies. The Mountain West was also looking at potentially adding Houston or SMU, both of which stated they would join the Big East in 2013, as its 12th football member. The Idaho Statesman obtained a copy of Boise State's MW offer sheet through an open records request; according to the sheet, if the MW extended an invitation to any school on or before January 31, 2013, the first offer had to be made to San Diego State.

On January 16, 2013, veteran sportswriter Mark Blaudschun reported on his blog, A Jersey Guy, that San Diego State and the Big East were working on a joint release announcing that the Aztecs would not join the Big East, and would stay in the MW. ESPN and CBS Sports quickly picked up the story. The MW presidents voted that day to readmit SDSU.

SDSU was not subject to a Big East exit fee (as noted earlier), but had to pay a $1.5 million exit fee to the Big West. The main concession SDSU received from the MW was that the school received its 2012–13 year-end distribution of $2.5 million from the MW, a sum that it had forfeited when it announced its departure.

SDSU athletic director Jim Sterk reportedly tried to make the Big East move work even after Boise State's decision to stay in the MW. While the Big East had one more football season under its current TV deal, which likely would have meant more money for SDSU in the 2013 season, further turnover in the Big East membership meant that the Big East could not guarantee or even solidly project future revenue. In addition, the decisions of Boise State and SDSU to stay in the MW gave the conference 12 football members in 2013; as a result, the MW was expected to (and ultimately did) split into divisions and launch a football championship game.

== Membership changes ==
| School | Sport(s) | Former conference | New conference | Date move was announced | Expected year move takes effect |
|---|---|---|---|---|---|
| Boise State Broncos | Full membership | WAC | Mountain West | June 11, 2010 | 2011 |
| Utah Utes | Full membership | Mountain West | Pac-12 | June 17, 2010 | 2011 |
| Fresno State Bulldogs | Full membership | WAC | Mountain West | August 18, 2010 | 2012 |
| Nevada Wolf Pack | Full membership | WAC | Mountain West | August 18, 2010 | 2012 |
| BYU Cougars | Full membership (non-football) | Mountain West | WCC | August 31, 2010 | 2011 |
| BYU Cougars | Football | Mountain West | Independent | August 31, 2010 | 2011 |
| BYU Cougars | Men's and women's swimming and diving | Mountain West | MPSF | October 19, 2010 | 2012 |
| Hawaiʻi Warriors | Football | WAC | Mountain West | December 10, 2010 | 2012 |
| BYU Cougars | Softball | Mountain West | WAC | January 27, 2011 | 2012 |
| BYU Cougars | Men's and women's indoor track and field | Mountain West | MPSF | March 17, 2011 | 2012 |
| TCU Horned Frogs | Full membership | Mountain West | Big 12 | October 10, 2011 | 2012 |
| San Jose State Spartans | Full membership | WAC | Mountain West | May 4, 2012 | 2013 |
| Utah State Aggies | Full membership | WAC | Mountain West | May 4, 2012 | 2013 |

== See also ==
- NCAA Division I conference realignment
- 2010–2014 NCAA conference realignment
- 2005 NCAA conference realignment
- 1996 NCAA conference realignment
