= 2010–2013 Atlantic 10 Conference realignment =

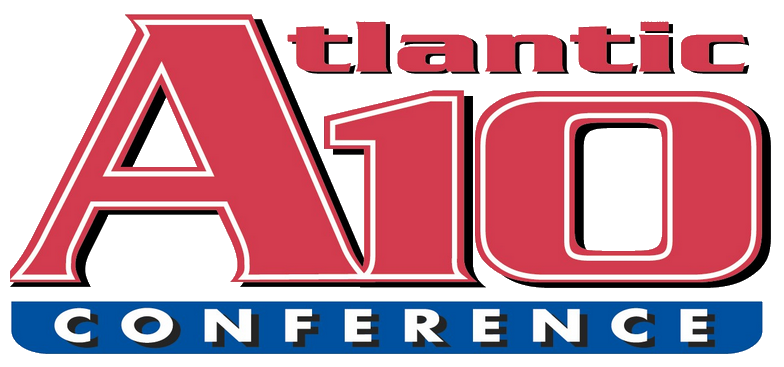

The 2010–13 Atlantic 10 Conference realignment refers to the Atlantic 10 Conference dealing with several proposed and actual conference expansion and reduction plans among various NCAA conferences and institutions from 2010 to 2013. Moves that involved the Atlantic 10 Conference were part of a much larger NCAA conference realignment.

== Background ==
The Atlantic 10 (A10) had suffered a major blow with the loss of traditional conference power Temple to the Big East in March 2012. Unlike the realignment moves in FBS (which were largely driven by football) the A10 (which does not sponsor football) made moves with basketball in mind, as the A10 is one of the strongest basketball conferences among those that do not play FBS football.

When it became clear that Temple was on its way out, the A10 entered into talks with Butler University of the Horizon League and George Mason University and Virginia Commonwealth University (VCU) of the CAA.

The first of these schools to make a move was Butler. On May 1, Andy Katz of ESPN.com reported that Butler would formally apply to the A10 the following day, and would join the conference for the 2013–14 season. The move was officially announced on May 2. Butler had been the Horizon League's most dominant men's basketball program in recent years; although the Bulldogs did not make the 2012 NCAA tournament, they reached the championship game in both 2010 and 2011. In addition, Butler's Indianapolis location gave the A10 a geographic bridge between Saint Louis and Ohio members Dayton and Xavier.

At the same time, Mason and VCU were seen as likely to bolt for the A10, giving that conference two more programs with recent Final Four appearances (Mason in 2006 and VCU in 2011). The possible loss of two of the CAA's marquee schools was called "a grim premonition for the CAA" by David Teel, a columnist with the Daily Press of Newport News, Virginia (home to the A10 offices). One source involved with the negotiations told Teel, "I just get a sense that all hell is about ready to break loose." However, Katz reported that the talks with VCU were on hold because athletic director Norwood Teague was soon to take the same position at Minnesota. He also indicated that the A10 was preparing for the upcoming loss of Charlotte.

Mason took itself out of the realignment picture for the time being on May 11, when AD Tom O'Connor told The Washington Post that it was staying in the CAA.

On May 14, CBS Sports reported that VCU would make its move to the A10 official the next day. Initially, VCU planned to move for the 2013–14 season, but when the official announcement came, it stated that the move would take effect with the 2012–13 season. Part of the reason for the immediate move was that under CAA bylaws, a team that announces its departure from the conference becomes immediately ineligible for the CAA men's basketball tournament. The CBS report also indicated that the league did not wish to expand beyond 14 full members, which in turn meant that only one of the two Virginia schools would receive an invitation. One reason cited for the Rams' move was the perception of the CAA as a "one-bid league"—from 2000 through 2012, only four CAA teams had received at-large bids to the NCAA tournament. In the same period, the A10 has had 20 at-large bids, including three to the 2012 tournament. Also, from 2006 to 2012, the A10 collected 36 "tournament units", awarded to a conference for each round advanced by one of its members, worth about $250,000 per unit. Even with Mason making the Final Four in 2006 and VCU doing the same in 2011, the CAA had only amassed 24 in the same period.

On May 29, Butler announced that it had reached an agreement with the Horizon League that allowed the Bulldogs to leave immediately for the A10. According to at least one media report, Butler changed its departure date in reaction to news that the Horizon League would not allow Butler to compete for any conference championships in the 2012–13 season. However, Horizon commissioner John LeCrone stated that unlike the CAA, that league had no such bylaw. Since the A-10 does not sponsor women's golf, Butler moved its team in that sport to the Metro Atlantic Athletic Conference (MAAC).

Further changes came to the Atlantic 10 in 2013. With the formation of a new conference out of the Big East by its seven private urban Catholic non-football members, speculation immediately arose that it would fill out its membership with several similar schools from the Atlantic 10. These included the private urban Catholic schools Xavier, Dayton and Saint Louis, along with non-Catholic Richmond and newly joined Butler and VCU (public, but urban and having a strong basketball program). By early March, the departure of Xavier and Butler was being reported as a certainty, causing Atlantic 10 commissioner Bernadette McGlade to deny that the conference had been informed of their pending departure. On March 20, 2013, the expected announcement came, that Xavier and Butler would be joining the new Big East, along with Creighton University of the Missouri Valley Conference, while Saint Louis and Dayton among other schools remain as possible future expansion candidates. The immediate response of McGlade was to suggest the league would replenish, without elaborating further. On March 25, the Atlantic 10 welcomed George Mason into the conference, effective July 1, 2013.

On May 8, 2013, the A-10 announced that longtime Southern Conference member Davidson College would join the A-10 effective July 1, 2014. Davidson's entry will restore a presence in the Charlotte area for the A-10.

== Membership changes ==
School	Sport(s)	Former conference	New conference	Date move was announced	Expected year move takes effect
Temple Owls	Full membership (except football)	Atlantic 10	AAC	March 7, 2012	2013
Butler Bulldogs	Full membership (non-football)	Horizon League	Atlantic 10	May 2, 2012	2012
Charlotte 49ers	Full membership	Atlantic 10	C-USA	May 4, 2012	2013
VCU Rams	Full membership (non-football)	CAA	Atlantic 10	May 15, 2012	2012
Butler Bulldogs	Full membership	Atlantic 10	New Big East	March 20, 2013	2013
Xavier Musketeers	Full membership	Atlantic 10	New Big East	March 20, 2013	2013
George Mason Patriots	Full membership	CAA	Atlantic 10	March 25, 2013	2013
Davidson Wildcats	Full membership	SoCon	Atlantic 10	May 8, 2013	2014
Davidson Wildcats	Field hockey	NorPac	Atlantic 10	May 8, 2013	2014
Davidson Wildcats	Men's and women's swimming and diving	CCSA	Atlantic 10	May 8, 2013	2014
Davidson Wildcats	Women's lacrosse	Big South	Atlantic 10	May 8, 2013	2014

== See also ==
- NCAA conference realignment
- 2010–13 NCAA conference realignment
- 2005 NCAA conference realignment
- 1996 NCAA conference realignment
