= 2010–2012 Southeastern Conference realignment =

The 2010–2012 Southeastern Conference realignment refers to the Southeastern Conference (SEC) dealing with several proposed and actual conference expansion and reduction plans among various NCAA conferences and institutions. Moves that involved the SEC were a relatively small part of a much larger NCAA conference realignment that began in the 2010–11 academic year and continued through the first half of 2014. The SEC was one of the least impacted conferences, as no member schools announced plans to join other conferences, while two schools from the Big 12 Conference joined the conference as all-sports members. Several other schools have been rumored as potential expansion candidates.

Although realignment within the NCAA continued into 2013 and 2014, the next credible rumors involving either current or potential future SEC members did not surface until 2021, when Big 12 members Oklahoma and Texas were widely reported to have seriously discussed a potential move to the SEC, soon followed by both schools receiving and accepting invitations to join the SEC in 2024.

== Background ==
The SEC last had a membership change in 1992, when Arkansas left the Southwest Conference and South Carolina, a football independent and a member of the Metro Conference in all other sports, joined. This allowed the SEC, which after the additions had 12 members, to split into divisions and hold the first conference championship game in Division I-A football. The SEC had also considered adding Texas, Texas A&M, Florida State, and Miami.

Neither the 1996 nor the 2005 conference realignments affected the SEC, as the conference neither gained nor lost members during either event, although once again Texas and Texas A&M were considered as members in 1996 after the dissolution of the Southwest Conference, before both joining the newly formed Big 12 Conference.

The next wave of realignment began in 2010, after both the Big Ten Conference and Pacific-10 Conference (now Pac-12) announced plans to expand to 12 members. These moves triggered a cascade of conference moves nationally.

Unlike other conferences such as the Big East (which required a 27-month notification period before a member could leave) and the ACC (which imposes a substantial exit fee to departing members, equal to three times the ACC's operating budget or around $50 million in the early 2010s), the SEC allows members to voluntarily leave the conference at will, with no exit fees. In addition, whereas a major point of contention within the Big 12 was the unequal distribution of revenue among member schools, the SEC distributes television revenues generally equally among member schools (with slightly higher allocations for schools participating in bowl games and the NCAA men's basketball tournament).

== 2010-2011 ==
Though the SEC was not looking to expand (and in no danger of losing any existing members), it was rumored that several schools were interested in joining the conference.

The most notable rumor involved Big 12 member Texas A&M. (This was not the first time that A&M had been rumored as an SEC candidate; A&M had been considered for membership as far back as 1990, when Arkansas and South Carolina ultimately joined.) A&M was part of a rumored move of six Big 12 schools to the then Pac-10: in addition to Colorado (which would be the first school offered and quickly joined), the other schools rumored involved long-time rival Texas, Texas Tech, Oklahoma, and Oklahoma State (at that time, the entirety of the Big 12 South Division excluding Baylor). However, A&M was reportedly also considering a move to the SEC (either paired with Oklahoma or by itself); it was rumored that Gene Stallings, the former A&M and Alabama football coach who was at that time a member of the A&M System Board of Regents, was leading the SEC move.

ESPN reported on June 11 that Texas, Texas Tech, and the two Oklahoma schools were prepared to accept an invitation from the Pac-10. The report also indicated that Texas A&M was torn between the Pac-10 and SEC, and was given a 72-hour deadline to decide on its future destination. Ultimately, the Texas and Oklahoma schools elected to remain in the Big 12, with A&M guaranteed a $20 million annual payment from Big 12 television revenues (equal to that of Texas and Oklahoma but above that of the remaining members).

Meanwhile, on the eastern side, rumored candidates included West Virginia from the Big East, and the ACC member institutions from Virginia and North Carolina excluding Wake Forest (the two "traditional Southern states" where the SEC does not have a member school; Virginia Tech being the most rumored as a possible pairing with fellow senior military college Texas A&M). Ultimately, neither West Virginia nor any ACC school joined the SEC. However, the threat of one or more of its members possibly joining the SEC in the future led the ACC to vote unanimously on September 13, 2011, to raise its exit fees to $20 million.

== 2011-2012 ==
As with the prior wave of realignment, the SEC had no issues with members seeking to leave and no concrete plans to expand. But as with the prior wave, rumors of possible expansion surfaced, once again led by Big 12 member Texas A&M.

In July 2011, the Texas A&M University System Board of Regents met to discuss the long-term impact of the Longhorn Network, a new TV channel devoted to Texas Longhorns sports that was set to launch a month later. Shortly before the meeting, an official of ESPN, partners with Texas in the network, gave a radio interview in which he strongly hinted that the network would also televise high school games of potential Longhorns recruits.

According to Sports Illustrated writer Andy Staples, the Longhorn Network broadcasting high school games (to the perceived benefit of Texas – which already operates the University Interscholastic League (UIL), the governing body for public school athletics in the state – and the perceived detriment of the conference's other schools) "was too much [for A&M] to bear." Though the Big 12 made new rules to stop the high school telecasts (and the NCAA would ultimately declare that such broadcasts would be considered in violation of recruiting rules), on August 15, 2011, the A&M System Regents met in a special session to, among other matters, authorize "the president (R. Bowen Loftin) to take all actions relating to Texas A&M University's athletic conference alignment", the first official step in A&M's long-rumored move to the SEC. In a 2021 interview for ESPN, Loftin recalled, "When the LHN was announced, that just galvanized our former and current students. We went from 50-50 to 95-5 [in favor of the SEC] almost overnight."

A&M announced on August 31, 2011, that it would leave the Big 12 in June 2012 to join the SEC (in what Dr. Loftin referred to as "the 100-year decision"), but the invitation process was prolonged by various moves by the Big 12, which feared that A&M's departure would scuttle the conference. Most notably, Baylor president Ken Starr threatened legal action if the SEC invited A&M. In early September, the SEC issued a formal invitation to Texas A&M, but it was dependent on the Big 12 and its members releasing the conference from any liability with regard to the move. The SEC invitation was not final until September 25.

Although at the time of the SEC's announcement of A&M's admission it was not actively pursuing additional members (notwithstanding scheduling issues arising from having 13 members), schools such as the aforementioned ACC schools and West Virginia from the 2010-2011 rumors once again came up as potential members. However, West Virginia ultimately joined the Big 12 on October 28, 2011.

But the Big 12 Conference's press release also hinted at another departure – Missouri was not listed among the "expected" ten members for the 2012–13 school year. The hint turned out to be correct: nine days later, on November 6, 2011, the SEC officially announced that it had added Missouri as its 14th member.

Though once again no ACC-member school opted to leave for the SEC, the ACC announced (concurrently with the announcement of Notre Dame joining the conference as a member in all sports except football) an even more massive increase in exit fees. The fee jumped from a fixed $20 million to an amount equal to three times the conference's annual operating budget (at the time a member announces its intent to leave; for 2012–13, the fee would be roughly $50 million).

The SEC expansion also indirectly led the Big 12 to revise its network deal with ESPN to extend it to 2025 (the same time as its deal with Fox Sports expires) and, more significantly for the stability of the conference, the conference also extended the league's grant of rights from six to 13 years (until 2025). This means that if a school leaves the Big 12 during the term of the newly extended contract, the league will keep all of that school's broadcast revenues for the duration.

== Membership changes ==
School	Sport(s)	Former conference	New conference	Date move was announced	Year move took effect
Texas A&M Aggies	Full membership	Big 12	SEC	August 31, 2011	2012
Missouri Tigers	Full membership	Big 12	SEC	November 6, 2011	2012

=== Gallery of SEC membership changes ===
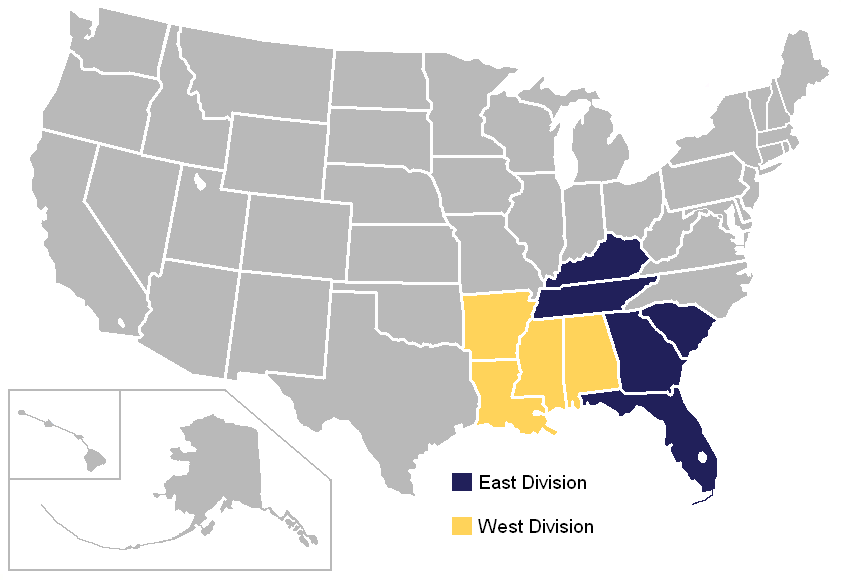
A map of the SEC as it existed between 1991 and 2012, with East (blue) and West (yellow) divisions

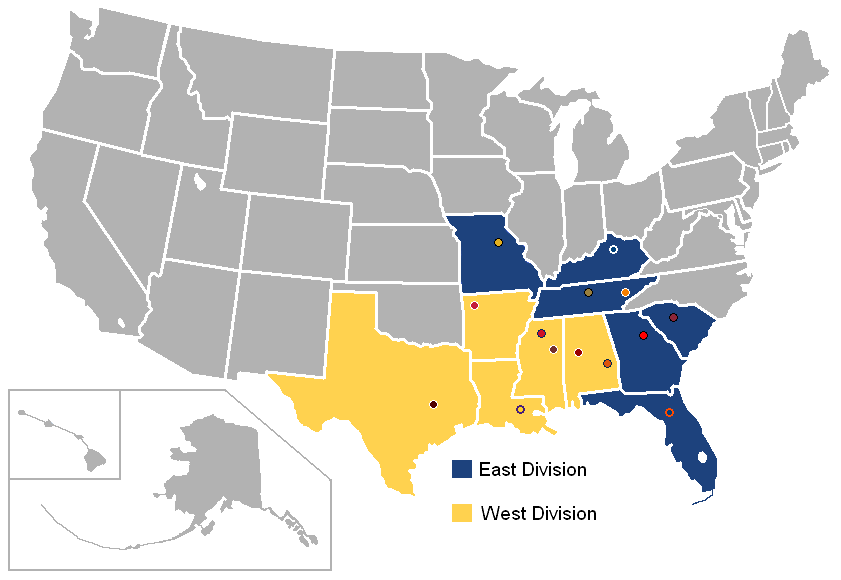
The SEC as it existed between 2012 and 2024, after the additions of Texas A&M and Missouri

== See also ==
- NCAA conference realignment
- 2005 NCAA conference realignment
- 1996 NCAA conference realignment
