= Fresno State–San Diego State football rivalry =

American college football rivalry

- Fresno State Bulldogs San Diego State Aztecs
- First meeting: November 29, 1923; San Diego State, 12–2
- Latest meeting: October 17, 2026; San Diego State, 26–23
- Next meeting: 2027
- Trophy: Oil Can

Statistics
- Total meetings: 64
- All-time series: San Diego State leads, 33–27–4
- Trophy series: Tie, 7–7
- Largest victory: Fresno State, 66–0 (1942)
- Longest win streak: San Diego State, 9 (1962–1970)
- Current win streak: San Diego State, 3 (2023–present)

Locations of Fresno State and San Diego State

The Fresno State–San Diego State football rivalry is an American college football rivalry between the Fresno State Bulldogs football team of California State University, Fresno and San Diego State Aztecs football team of San Diego State University (SDSU). Both schools are members of the Pac-12 Conference. The winner of the game receives "The Old Oil Can" trophy.

== History ==
The rivalry dates back to 1923 when the two teams competed in the Southern California Junior College Conference. The Aztecs won 12–2 at home. Since then, the sides have met 52 more times, including every year from 1945 to 1979, when the two competed in the same conference or were independents. After not facing one another between 1979 and 1991, the schools resumed the annual series from 1992 to 1998, when both were members of the Western Athletic Conference. In 1999 the Aztecs were one of eight teams that left the WAC to form the Mountain West Conference (MW), which put the rivalry on hold. The two teams however met in 2002 in Fresno. The Bulldogs defeated the Aztecs in a close game 16–14. The rivalry was stalled once again until the two teams met in 2011. The game resulted in an Aztec win 35–28. In 2012, the Bulldogs joined the MW, which renewed the rivalry once again. When the MW expanded to 12 football members and split into divisions for that sport in 2013, the Aztecs and Bulldogs were placed in the new West Division, ensuring annual games for the foreseeable future. On September 12, 2024, the Pac-12 Conference announced that the Aztecs and Bulldogs will join the conference, beginning in 2026. San Diego State leads the series 33–27–4, including a 18–13–2 mark in San Diego, a 15–13–2 mark in Fresno and losing the only meeting in Carson.

== Oil Can ==
The Oil Can trophy comes from a 1930s-era oil can hailing from Fresno that was found at a construction site at San Diego State. "The oil can likely came from a time when Aztec and Bulldog fans traveled to football games between the two schools via the old, twisting, precipitous Grapevine section of Highway 99 over Tejon Pass," said Jacquelyn K. Glasener, executive director of the Fresno State Alumni Association. "Cars in those days carried extra oil and water to be sure they could make it through difficult trips," added Jim Herrick, executive director of the San Diego State Alumni Association. The two alumni associations made the oil can into a trophy and the teams started competing for it during the 2011 season.

== Game results ==
Fresno State victories	San Diego State victories	Tie games

No.	Date	Location	Winner	Score
1	November 29, 1923	San Diego, CA	San Diego State	12–2
2	November 27, 1924	Fresno, CA	Fresno State	7–0
3	October 30, 1926	San Diego, CA	Fresno State	28–7
4	December 5, 1931	Fresno, CA	San Diego State	15–0
5	October 25, 1940	San Diego, CA	Tie	0–0
6	October 25, 1941	Fresno, CA	Fresno State	26–0
7	October 11, 1942	San Diego, CA	Fresno State	66–0
8	October 27, 1945	Fresno, CA	San Diego State	7–0
9	October 26, 1946	San Diego, CA	San Diego State	7–0
10	November 1, 1947	Fresno, CA	Tie	7–7
11	November 6, 1948	San Diego, CA	Fresno State	7–6
12	November 5, 1949	Fresno, CA	San Diego State	18–7
13	October 21, 1950	San Diego, CA	Tie	20–20
14	November 3, 1951	Fresno, CA	San Diego State	13–7
15	November 1, 1952	San Diego, CA	Fresno State	49–33
16	October 31, 1953	Fresno, CA	Tie	27–27
17	October 30, 1954	San Diego, CA	Fresno State	20–0
18	November 5, 1955	Fresno, CA	Fresno State	20–6
19	November 17, 1956	San Diego, CA	Fresno State	50–7
20	November 3, 1957	Fresno, CA	Fresno State	27–0
21	November 1, 1958	San Diego, CA	Fresno State	22–20
22	October 31, 1959	Fresno, CA	Fresno State	38–13
23	October 29, 1960	San Diego, CA	Fresno State	60–0
24	October 28, 1961	Fresno, CA	Fresno State	27–6
25	October 27, 1962	San Diego, CA	San Diego State	29–26
26	November 2, 1963	Fresno, CA	San Diego State	34–6
27	October 31, 1964	San Diego, CA	San Diego State	44–6
28	October 30, 1965	Fresno, CA	San Diego State	26–7
29	October 29, 1966	San Diego, CA	San Diego State	34–13
30	October 28, 1967	Fresno, CA	San Diego State	28–21
31	November 2, 1968	San Diego, CA	San Diego State	42–12
32	November 1, 1969	Fresno, CA	San Diego State	48–20
33	October 31, 1970	San Diego, CA	#14 San Diego State	56–14

No.	Date	Location	Winner	Score
34	October 30, 1971	Fresno, CA	Fresno State	17–10
35	October 28, 1972	San Diego, CA	San Diego State	21–14
36	November 17, 1973	Fresno, CA	San Diego State	41–6
37	October 12, 1974	San Diego, CA	San Diego State	24–21
38	October 11, 1975	Fresno, CA	San Diego State	29–0
39	September 18, 1976	San Diego, CA	San Diego State	7–3
40	October 8, 1977	Fresno, CA	Fresno State	34–14
41	October 7, 1978	San Diego, CA	San Diego State	31–14
42	September 22, 1979	Fresno, CA	San Diego State	32–23
43	November 21, 1992	San Diego, CA	Fresno State	45–41
44	November 20, 1993	Fresno, CA	Fresno State	63–37
45	November 26, 1994	San Diego, CA	Fresno State	49–42
46	October 14, 1995	San Diego, CA	San Diego State	48–24
47	November 23, 1996	San Diego, CA	San Diego State	31–21
48	November 15, 1997	Fresno, CA	San Diego State	20–19
49	November 7, 1998	San Diego, CA	San Diego State	10–0
50	August 29, 2002	Fresno, CA	Fresno State	16–14
51	December 3, 2011	San Diego, CA	San Diego State	35–28
52	September 29, 2012	Fresno, CA	Fresno State	52–40
53	October 26, 2013	San Diego, CA	#15 Fresno State	35–28
54	October 3, 2014	Fresno, CA	Fresno State	24–13
55	October 3, 2015	San Diego, CA	San Diego State	21–7
56	October 14, 2016	Fresno, CA	San Diego State	17–3
57	October 21, 2017	San Diego, CA	Fresno State	27–3
58	November 17, 2018	Fresno, CA	Fresno State	23–14
59	November 15, 2019	San Diego, CA	San Diego State	17–7
60	October 30, 2021	Carson, CA	Fresno State	30–20
61	October 29, 2022	Fresno, CA	Fresno State	32–28
62	November 25, 2023	San Diego, CA	San Diego State	33–18
63	October 25, 2025	Fresno, CA	San Diego State	23–0
64	October 17, 2026	San Diego, CA	San Diego State	26–23
Series: San Diego State leads 33–27–4

== See also ==
- List of NCAA college football rivalry games
