= 2010–2013 Sun Belt Conference realignment =

The 2010–13 Sun Belt Conference realignment refers to the Sun Belt Conference dealing with several proposed and actual conference expansion and reduction plans among various NCAA conferences and institutions from 2010 to 2013.

== Background ==
The Sun Belt Conference had seen little effect from the first several rounds of realignment, with the only change being the loss of non-football member Denver to the WAC. Although South Alabama had announced it would establish an FBS football program and join the Sun Belt football league in 2012, this move was finalized before the Big Ten and Pac-10 set the realignment process into motion.

However, reports emerged in March 2012 that the conference considered Charlotte and UTSA "leading candidates" for expansion, and had entered into talks with both schools. One source indicated that both had received informal invitations. In another significant move, the Sun Belt replaced its commissioner Wright Waters, who retired on March 15, with WAC commissioner Karl Benson.

The Sun Belt's first official move, however, involved neither Charlotte nor UTSA. Instead, CBSSports.com reported on April 3 that conference presidents had voted to extend an invitation to Georgia State University, then a member of the Colonial Athletic Association, effective in 2013. Four days later, it was reported that Georgia State had accepted the invitation, and that the move would officially be announced on April 9. As a part of this move, the school will move its football program from FCS to FBS, play a full conference schedule in 2013, and become a full FBS member in 2014.

The timing of Georgia State's move was no coincidence. The CAA was set to vote on April 10 to increase its exit fee from $250,000 to at least $1 million. Also, the NCAA has a deadline of June 1 for Division I FCS schools to announce the start of a transition to FBS.

On May 2, the Sun Belt and Texas State announced that the Bobcats would leave the WAC after only one season and join the Sun Belt in 2013. Benson implied that the Sun Belt's invitation to Texas State was in part driven by the then-rumored departure of North Texas to Conference USA:

"It was important that we remain in the state of Texas, and Texas State certainly does that, regardless of what happens with the University of North Texas."

At that time, it was reported by Sun Belt commissioner Karl Benson that it would be his goal to expand the SBC to 12 teams in order to sponsor a conference championship game.

The Sun Belt then announced on May 23 that UT Arlington, at the time a non-football school in the Southland Conference that was set to join the WAC that July, had accepted an invitation to join the Sun Belt in 2013. The move became official the following day, after approval by the University of Texas Board of Regents. Also on May 23, Benson categorically stated that the Sun Belt would not expand beyond 10 football members—a move that could have forced Idaho and New Mexico State, the only two football programs remaining in the WAC beyond 2012, to drop to FCS football.

On November 28, 2012, Conference USA added current Sun Belt members Middle Tennessee State and Florida Atlantic, later announcing the two would join that conference in 2013.

On March 27, 2013, the Sun Belt announced the addition of four more members, two in all sports and two for football only, in 2014. Appalachian State and Georgia Southern will begin FBS transitions in 2013, join the Sun Belt in 2014, and become full FBS members in 2015. After the WAC dropped football, Idaho, a former football-only Sun Belt member, and New Mexico State, formerly an all-sports member, will both return for football after one season as FBS independents.

On September 1, 2015, the Sun Belt announced the addition of Coastal Carolina as a full member effective 2016 for all sports except football. For football, Coastal Carolina will begin its FBS transition in 2016, join the conference in 2017, and become bowl-eligible in 2018.

On March 1, 2016, the Sun Belt announced that it would not renew the associate memberships of Idaho and New Mexico State for football after the 2017 FBS season.

== Membership changes ==
School	Sport(s)	Former conference	New conference	Date move was announced	Year move took effect
Denver Pioneers	Full membership (non-football)	Sun Belt	WAC	November 10, 2010	2012
Georgia State Panthers	Full membership	CAA	Sun Belt	April 9, 2012	2013
Texas State Bobcats	Full membership	WAC	Sun Belt	May 2, 2012	2013
FIU Panthers	Full membership	Sun Belt	C-USA	May 4, 2012	2013
North Texas Mean Green	Full membership	Sun Belt	C-USA	May 4, 2012	2013
UT Arlington Mavericks	Full membership (non-football)	WAC	Sun Belt	May 24, 2012	2013
Florida Atlantic Owls	Full membership	Sun Belt	C-USA	November 29, 2012	2013
Middle Tennessee Blue Raiders	Full membership	Sun Belt	C-USA	November 29, 2012	2013
Appalachian State Mountaineers	Full membership	SoCon	Sun Belt	March 27, 2013	2014
Georgia Southern Eagles	Full membership	SoCon	Sun Belt	March 27, 2013	2014
Idaho Vandals	Football	Independent	Sun Belt	March 27, 2013	2014
New Mexico State Aggies	Football	Independent	Sun Belt	March 27, 2013	2014
Western Kentucky Hilltoppers and Lady Toppers	Full membership	Sun Belt	C-USA	April 1, 2013	2014
Coastal Carolina Chanticleers	Full membership	Big South	Sun Belt	September 1, 2015	2016 (all sports except football); 2017 (football)
Idaho Vandals	Football	Sun Belt	Big Sky	March 1, 2016	2018
New Mexico State Aggies	Football	Sun Belt	Independent	March 1, 2016	2018

== See also ==
- NCAA conference realignment
- 2005 NCAA conference realignment
- 1996 NCAA conference realignment
