= EWL =

EWL may refer to:

- East West MRT line, Rapid transit line in Singapore.
- European Women's Lobby
- Eastern Wrestling League
