= 2010–2013 Big 12 Conference realignment =

The 2010–2013 Big 12 Conference realignment refers to the Big 12 Conference (Big 12) dealing with several proposed and actual conference expansion and reduction plans among various NCAA conferences and institutions. Part of a larger NCAA conference realignment that began in the 2010–11 academic year and continued through 2013–14, the Big 12 was one of the more severely impacted conferences. In all, four schools left during this cycle (Colorado, Missouri, Nebraska, Texas A&M) and two joined (West Virginia, TCU).

== First wave ==
Nebraska announced that it would leave the Big 12 Conference for the Big Ten Conference effective in 2011.

Colorado also announced a change in conference alignment; originally planning to transfer to the Pac-10 for the 2012–13 season, the school agreed to depart a year early after Nebraska announced its plans to depart the conference in 2011.

With the loss of Colorado (who had been a member of the Big 12 and its predecessor the Big Eight Conference since 1947) to the Pac-10 and Nebraska (whose association with the Big 12 dates back to the 1907 founding of what was to become the Big Eight) to the Big Ten, the Big 12 was reduced to ten teams and faced more possible attrition.

Other Big 12 schools were rumored to be candidates for expansion by other conferences, including further expansion by the Pac-10 or Big Ten. Speculation and rumors centered on Texas, Texas Tech, Oklahoma, and Oklahoma State following Colorado to the Pac-10. Texas A&M was also considered as a PAC-10 candidate but was also reportedly considering a move to the SEC.

ESPN reported on June 11 that Texas, Texas Tech, and the two Oklahoma schools were prepared to accept an invitation from the Pac-10. The report also indicated that Texas A&M was torn between the Pac-10 and SEC and was given a 72-hour deadline to decide on its future destination. Meanwhile, Baylor announced that it would wait and see what the final outcome of the Big 12's realignment would be before making any final decision concerning where they would go if the Big 12 dissolved. On June 14, ESPN, citing sources within the Big 12, initially reported that Texas, Texas Tech, Oklahoma, and Oklahoma State would join the Pac-10 no later than June 15, while Texas A&M was now most likely to opt for the SEC. The remaining Big 12 schools Baylor, Iowa State, Kansas, Kansas State, and Missouri may have been left to find new leagues, with early speculation pointing to a possible move for some of those schools to the Mountain West or Big East conferences. Kansas men's basketball coach Bill Self stated, on the day that TCU announced its entry into the Big East, that had the Big 12 collapsed the Big East would have offered membership to Kansas, Kansas State, Iowa State, and Missouri.

On June 14, reports started surfacing that the almost certain departure of Texas (and, along with them, several other schools) from the Big 12 would not happen. Indications were that a last-minute effort by Big 12 Commissioner Dan Beebe to hold the 10-remaining Big 12 teams together might be successful. Beebe's plan showed that the remaining 10 schools could nearly double their television revenue if they stuck with the Big 12. In addition, Beebe said that Texas would be allowed to start its own network if the school stayed with the Big 12—a business move that Texas has wanted to do that would not be allowed in the Pac-10. If Texas decided to stay with the Big 12, that had the potential to effectively end any further realignment in the NCAA, save for one or two moves in the Pac-10 and Mountain West Conference. However, others were saying that while Texas might want to keep the Big 12 together with this deal, the remaining Big 12 South teams that were considering departing the Big 12 (Texas Tech, Texas A&M, Oklahoma and Oklahoma State) would not be interested in a deal that would give a school that already has a competitive advantage an even larger one.

Later that day, Andy Katz of ESPN.com, citing an NCAA source with direct knowledge of the negotiations, reported that many prominent figures inside and outside of college athletics, many of whom had no direct stake in their outcome, had worked to broker a deal that would satisfy Texas and keep the Big 12 viable with 10 members. The group believed that the Pac-10 approach was not in the best interest of the schools involved. In the end, Texas would decide to stay in the truncated Big 12, with the remaining Big 12 South schools pledging their support for the conference shortly thereafter. The Pac-10 was still seeking a 12th member to join with Colorado; early speculation focused on Mountain West member Utah as the next Pac-10 expansion target.

On June 17, twenty-six Texas legislators, spearheaded by Garnet Coleman and Bill Callegari, from the Houston area co-authored an open letter to the Big 12 that asked the conference to consider adding Houston as a member.

== Second wave ==
Texas A&M had been considering a move to the Southeastern Conference (SEC) at least since the early 1990s, when the Southwest Conference (SWC), then home to A&M and three other Big 12 charter members, was nearing collapse. The Aggies' head football coach at the time, R. C. Slocum, had met with then-SEC commissioner Roy Kramer to gauge that league's interest in A&M; according to a 2021 retrospective by ESPN journalist Dave Wilson, "Both the SEC and the Aggies were intrigued by the fit." However, when the SWC finally collapsed, Texas politicians, led by the then-current governor Ann Richards and lieutenant governor Bob Bullock, threatened to pull state funding from both A&M and Texas unless they brought Baylor and Texas Tech into the Big 12.

In the early 2010s, then-A&M president R. Bowen Loftin was, according to Wilson, "uncomfortable with the lack of stability in the Big 12." Loftin recalled in 2021 that he had felt discomfort with the conference since attending his first meeting of the conference board shortly after becoming president in 2009. In an obvious reference to Texas, Loftin remarked, "That was sort of eye-opening, It was pretty clear how things worked. One school was pretty much in charge of how the conference was going to go. [Then-Big 12 commissioner Dan] Beebe was clearly beholden to that school. That gave me pause."

The year after this meeting, when Texas was considering a move to the then-Pac-10 Conference, Loftin asked Texas president Bill Powers about the situation. Loftin recalled that Powers' response was, "I can't talk about that. But don't worry, we'll take care of you." He saw the response as condescending, telling Wilson "I took that very personally."

In July 2011, the Texas A&M System Board of Regents met to discuss the long-term impact of the Longhorn Network (LHN), a new TV channel devoted to Texas Longhorns sports that was set to launch a month later. Shortly before the meeting, an official of ESPN, partners with Texas in the network, gave a radio interview in which he strongly hinted that the network would also televise high school games of potential Longhorns recruits. (Texas operates the University Interscholastic League (UIL), the governing body for public school athletics in the state.)

According to Sports Illustrated writer Andy Staples, the LHN broadcasting high school games (to the potential benefit of Texas and the detriment of the conference's other Texas-based schools) "was too much [for A&M] to bear." Loftin recalled in 2021 that "When the LHN was announced, that just galvanized our former and current students. We went from 50-50 to 95-5 [in favor of the SEC] almost overnight." Though the Big 12 made new rules to stop the high school telecasts (and the NCAA would ultimately declare that such broadcasts would be considered in violation of recruiting rules), the Regents decided to pursue an invitation to the SEC, which had been considered the prior year during realignment discussions involving the Big 12 and the Pac-12.

A&M announced on August 31, 2011 that it would leave the Big 12 in June 2012 to join the SEC, but the invitation process was prolonged by various moves by the Big 12, which feared that A&M's departure would scuttle the conference. Most notably, Baylor president Ken Starr threatened legal action if the SEC invited A&M. In early September, the SEC issued a formal invitation to Texas A&M, but it was dependent on the Big 12 and its members dropping any potential lawsuits related to the move. The SEC invitation was not final until September 25. By this time, the Big 12 was already pursuing TCU as a replacement for Texas A&M.

On October 6, 2011, the conference announced that it had invited TCU, with the school's acceptance coming four days later. The Horned Frogs would join the Big 12 on July 1, 2012.

On October 28, 2011, the conference formally invited West Virginia to join. The university accepted the invitation the same day, and also became a full member effective July 1, 2012. The conference's press release also hinted at Missouri's imminent departure, as it was not listed among the "expected" ten members for the 2012–13 school year.

Nine days later, on November 6, 2011, the SEC officially announced that it had added Missouri as its 14th member.

== Later developments ==
West Virginia's entry into the Big 12 was held up by a legal dispute between the school and the Big East Conference, which sought to enforce a 27-month waiting period included in the league's bylaws. The dispute was settled on February 14, 2012, with the Big 12 and WVU paying a combined $20 million.

The next move for the conference was to attempt to find stability in an upgraded TV deal. Before the realignment, the Big 12 had a contract with ESPN and ABC that ran through the 2016 season, and had signed a deal with Fox that would start in 2013 and run through 2025. The Big 12 then negotiated an extension to the ESPN/ABC deal that brought its ending date to 2025 to match the Fox deal. Combined, the two deals will reportedly give the conference a total of $2.6 billion, which translates to $20 million per year for each school if the conference remains at 10 members. More significantly for the stability of the conference, the deal also includes an extension of the league's grant of rights from six to 13 years, to match the duration of the new contract. This means that if a school leaves the Big 12 during the term of the newly extended contract, the league will keep all of that school's broadcast revenues for the duration. It was also reported that the Big 12 may try to expand further, although few candidates were available that would add value to the new TV deal. Big East member Louisville was interested in moving to the Big 12, but later accepted an invitation to join the ACC.

In May 2012, several Florida State University figures sent decidedly mixed messages about that school's future in the ACC, expressing at least some interest in a move to the Big 12. First, on May 12, as the ACC's annual spring meetings were about to begin, the chairman of the school's board of trustees, Andy Haggard, blasted the conference's newest media rights deal, telling an FSU fan site that the school "unanimously" favored "seeing what the Big 12 might have to offer". However, his statement was inaccurate on some key points of the deal. On the same day, head football coach Jimbo Fisher told the Orlando Sentinel, "There have been no official talks, but I think you always have to look out there to see what's best for Florida State. If that [jumping to the Big 12] is what's best for Florida State, then that's what we need to do." In the meantime, FSU president Eric Barron sent out a statement from his email account that listed four reasons to move to the Big 12, followed by seven reasons why FSU should stay in the ACC. Barron also took a dig at the Big 12, saying that the school's faculty considered it "academically weaker" than the ACC. The mixed messages continued in the following days. Former FSU football All-American Derrick Brooks, also a former member of the FSU board of trustees, appeared on the Tim Brando Show, a national sports talk program, and claimed that the Big 12 was actively pursuing Florida State. All this led CBS Sports' Tony Barnhart to state that "the speculation on Florida State's future is at DEFCON 1." Finally, when FSU athletic director Randy Spetman was asked for comment on the rumors surrounding the school's future plans, all he said was "I don't know how Derrick got that."

After the Big 12 was shut out of the initial College Football Playoff in 2014 despite TCU and Baylor finishing as co-champions at 11–1, there was speculation that the Big 12 might expand back to 12 teams (or more) in order to host a conference championship game. Teams speculated to join include Boise State, BYU, Central Florida, Colorado State, and Memphis, as well as schools closer to West Virginia to give the Big 12 a potential East Division such as Cincinnati. Ultimately, NCAA rules were changed to allow conferences to hold a championship game with only 10 teams causing the drive for further expansion to abate.

== Membership changes ==
School	Sport(s)	Former conference	New conference	Date move was announced	Year move took effect
Colorado Buffaloes	Full membership	Big 12	Pac-12	June 10, 2010	2011
Nebraska Cornhuskers	Full membership	Big 12	Big Ten	June 11, 2010	2011
Texas A&M Aggies	Full membership	Big 12	SEC	August 31, 2011	2012
TCU Horned Frogs	Full membership	Mountain West	Big 12	October 10, 2011	2012
West Virginia Mountaineers	Full membership	Big East	Big 12	October 28, 2011	2012
Missouri Tigers	Full membership	Big 12	SEC	November 6, 2011	2012
West Virginia Mountaineers	Wrestling	Eastern Wrestling League	Big 12	April 9, 2012	2013
Missouri Tigers	Wrestling	Big 12	MAC	September 19, 2012	2012

=== Gallery of Big 12 membership changes ===
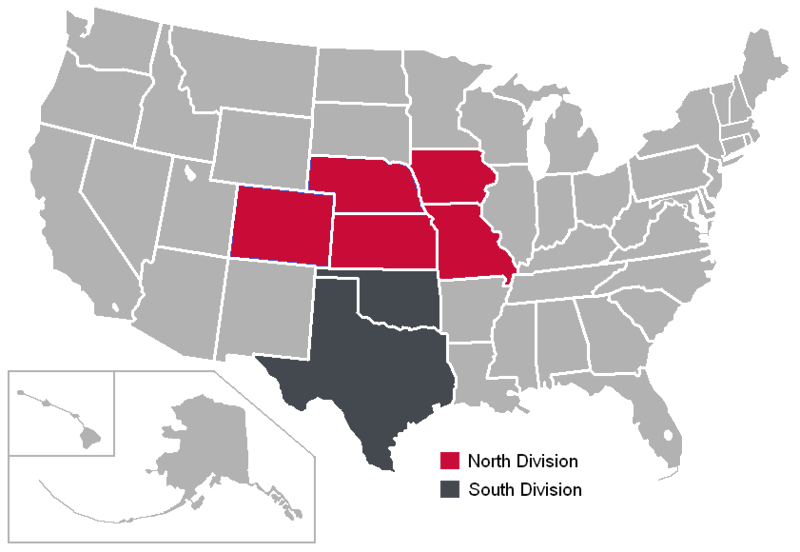
A map of the Big 12 as it existed from 1996 to 2011, with North (red) and South (grey) divisions

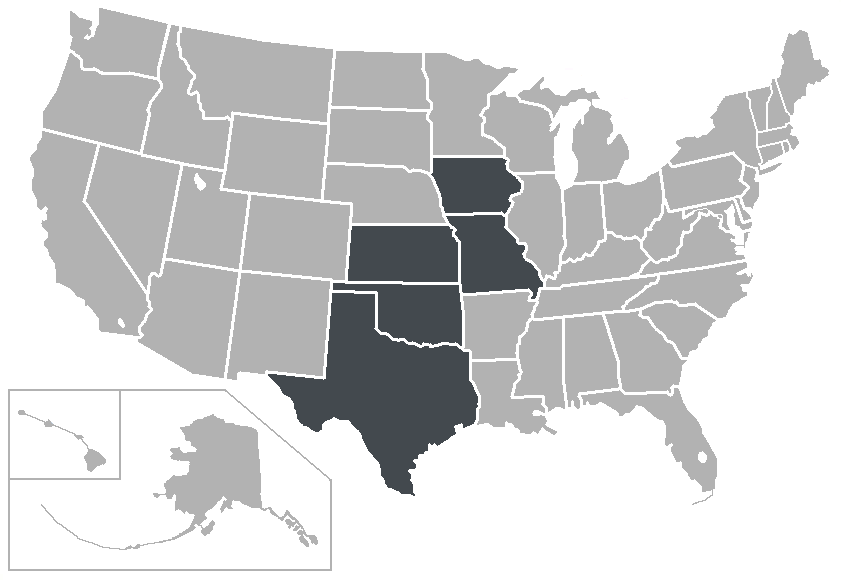
The Big 12 as it existed from 2011 to 2012, after the departures of Colorado and Nebraska

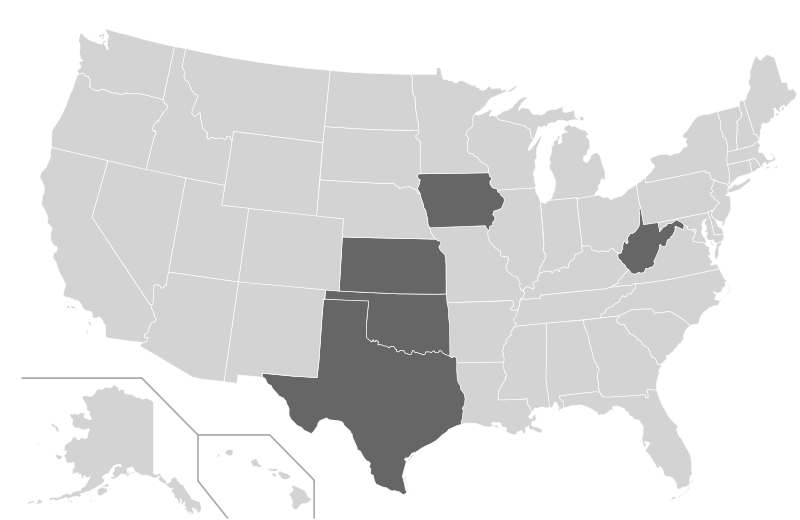
The Big 12 as it existed from 2012 to 2023, after the departures of Texas A&M and Missouri and the additions of TCU and West Virginia

== See also ==
- 1996 NCAA conference realignment
- 2005 NCAA conference realignment
- 2021–2026 NCAA conference realignment
- List of NCAA Division I conference changes in the 2020s
