= College Football Association =

Negotiated TV contracts with networks, 1977–1997

The College Football Association (CFA) was a group formed by many of the American colleges with top-level college football programs in order to negotiate contracts with TV networks to televise football games. It was formed in 1977 by 63 schools from most of the major college football conferences and selected schools whose football programs were independent of any conference.

One by one, the major conferences (and Notre Dame, the most prominent independent program) would eventually negotiate their own separate TV deals, reducing the importance of the CFA. The CFA shut down in 1997.

== History ==
=== Background ===
In 1977, when the CFA was formed, the National Collegiate Athletic Association (NCAA) had controlled all college football TV rights since the early 1950s. It limited the number of games shown on TV because of a concern that televising more games would hurt attendance.

The schools that formed the CFA banded together because of what they viewed as obstructionism of the NCAA by smaller schools. "People were just fed up with the NCAA's parochialism, power grab, etc., but also they wanted more money, they wanted to maximize and they wanted their fans to be able to see them on TV," said James Ponsoldt, a law professor at the University of Georgia.

The CFA was formed by schools from the Atlantic Coast Conference, the Big Eight Conference, the Southeastern Conference, the Southwest Conference, and the Western Athletic Conference, plus independents Notre Dame, Penn State, Pittsburgh, West Virginia, and the service academies. Schools from the Big Ten Conference and the Pacific-8 Conference did not join the CFA.

Under the tenure of CFA executive directory Chuck Neinas, the CFA negotiated its own TV deal in 1981, which prompted the NCAA to threaten sanctions against any colleges participating in the CFA deal, in all sports, not just football. The Universities of Georgia and Oklahoma, two prominent members of the CFA, sued the NCAA in U.S. District Court, seeking an injunction that would prevent the NCAA from imposing sanctions against CFA members, and asserting that the NCAA was engaged in restraint of trade and price-fixing.

On June 27, 1984, the U.S. Supreme Court ruled in NCAA v. Board of Regents of University of Oklahoma that the NCAA's television plan violated the Sherman Antitrust Act. As a result, individual schools and athletic conferences were freed to negotiate contracts on their own behalf. Together with the growth of cable television, this ruling resulted in the explosion of broadcast options currently available. Beginning in 1984, the CFA sold a television package to ABC and ESPN. The Big Ten and Pacific-10 conferences sold their own separate package to CBS.

=== Decline ===
By the 1991 season, the television landscape changed. ABC had both the CFA and Big Ten–Pac-10 packages, and Notre Dame split from the CFA to sign an exclusive deal with NBC. The CFA was once again relegated to limited appearances. The beginning of the end for the CFA occurred in 1995, when the Southeastern Conference and Big East broke from the CFA, signing a national deal with CBS. After CBS began covering the SEC exclusively in 2001, the SEC was (through 2022) the only major conference guaranteed a national "game of the week" on network television, as Fox and ESPN/ABC have the rights to multiple conferences. (Note: Following media rights realignments in 2023–24, the SEC now airs its broadcast TV game of the week on ABC, while the Big Ten has dedicated weekly windows on both CBS and NBC.)

The CFA ended its operations on June 30, 1997.
