= 1996 NCAA conference realignment =

The 1996 NCAA conference realignment was initiated by the dissolution of the Southwest Conference (SWC), the formation of the Big 12 Conference and Conference USA (C-USA), and the expansion of the Western Athletic Conference to 16 teams. Overall, 27 schools changed conference affiliation, and the Big 12 joined the Southeastern Conference as the first modern power conferences in college football.

== Affected conferences ==
=== Southwest Conference ===
The Southwest Conference was what would now be considered to be one of the Power conferences of college football. From 1992 to 1994, the conference was part of the Bowl Coalition including its agreement to send its champion to the Cotton Bowl Classic, and in the 1995 football season, it was part of the Bowl Alliance, the successor of the Bowl Coalition (though the Cotton Bowl was left out of the Bowl Alliance).

The Southwest Conference was founded in 1914 of mainly prominent schools from Texas and bordering states. From 1976 to 1991, its membership consisted of Baylor University, Rice University, Southern Methodist University, University of Texas at Austin, Texas A&M University, Texas Christian University, Texas Tech University, University of Houston, and the University of Arkansas.

During the 1980s the SWC was plagued by 2/3 of its membership being on probation, at one time or another, for NCAA recruiting violations (only Arkansas, Baylor and Rice avoided NCAA sanctions). The most notable involved the "Pony Express" scandals at SMU resulting in the football team receiving the "Death Penalty" in 1987. At that time, the NCAA prohibited a program on probation from appearing on live television.

The Southwest Conference was one of six conferences that packaged its media rights with the College Football Association. When other conferences began breaking off from the CFA, The Southwest Conference was in a weak spot due to its scandals reducing its on-field performance and only having schools in one state after Arkansas departed for the Southeastern Conference after the 1991 football season.

As conferences realized the opportunity of selling media rights separate from other conferences was the way the sport was moving, the SWC and the Big Eight Conference began talks of a merger. Other conferences like the Southeastern Conference and the Pacific-10 Conference were interested in Texas and Texas A&M, but the Big Eight was open to a full merger of all sixteen schools. However, once the conferences believed that ESPN would be their most lucrative television partner, the network made it clear that it wanted a conference of twelve teams with all eight from the Big Eight, and four from the Southwest Conference, including Texas & Texas A&M. Big Eight officials assumed the eleventh and twelfth schools included would be the other public schools of Texas Tech and Houston, but when Texas government officials worked on granting permission for the large public schools to leave the Southwest Conference for a merger, Houston was excluded in favor of Baylor.

In 1994, Texas, Texas A&M, Baylor, and Texas Tech accepted invitations to join with the members of the Big Eight Conference to form the Big 12 Conference starting with the 1996 football season. The four schools left out of the Big 12 found new conference homes as well, but in less prominent conferences. Rice, SMU, and TCU accepted invitations to join the Western Athletic Conference, while Houston was a founding member of Conference USA.

=== Big Eight Conference ===
The Big Eight Conference was formed in 1907. It informally adopted the name of Big Eight in 1957 when Oklahoma State joined, and legally took that name in 1964. Its member schools from 1957 to 1996 were the University of Nebraska–Lincoln, Iowa State University, the University of Colorado at Boulder, the University of Kansas, Kansas State University, the University of Missouri, the University of Oklahoma, and Oklahoma State University. Like the Southwest Conference, the Big Eight was a major conference with membership in the Bowl Coalition and Bowl Alliance, and longstanding ties to the Orange Bowl.

On February 25, 1994, it was announced that a new conference would be formed from the members of the Big Eight and four of the Texas member colleges of the Southwest Conference. Though the name would not be made official for several months, newspaper accounts immediately dubbed the new entity the "Big 12". Charter members of the Big 12 included the members of the Big Eight plus Baylor, Texas, Texas A&M and Texas Tech.

=== Western Athletic Conference ===
The Western Athletic Conference had 10 members, and desired to hold a conference championship game, which at the time required at least twelve members.

The WAC ended up adding six schools to its ranks for a total of sixteen. Rice, TCU, and SMU joined the league from the Southwest Conference, which had disbanded. Big West Conference members San Jose State and UNLV were also admitted, as well as Tulsa which was an independent in football but housed other sports in the Missouri Valley Conference.

In addition to the massive expansion of the league, two pre-expansion members, Air Force and Hawaiʻi, brought their women's sports into the conference. Air Force had previously housed its women's sports in the Division II Colorado Athletic Conference, while the Hawaiʻi women had been in the Big West.

This "new" WAC ultimately did not last long, as eight of its 16 members left the conference in 1999 and founded the Mountain West Conference.

=== Conference USA ===
Conference USA was founded in 1995 by the merger of the Metro Conference and Great Midwest Conference, two Division I conferences that did not sponsor football at the time. The conference's football membership consisted of Cincinnati and Memphis from the Great Midwest, and Louisville, Southern Miss, Memphis, and Tulane from Metro. These five schools had been football independents before the formation of Conference USA. The conference had six other non-football members (DePaul, Marquette, Saint Louis, UAB from Great Midwest, Charlotte, and South Florida from Metro).

Since this left an uneven number of schools in the conference (11 total and five in football), Houston of the dissolving Southwest Conference was extended an invitation and agreed to join following the SWC's disbanding at the end of the 1995–96 academic year. The conference immediately started competition in all sports in 1995, except football which started in 1996.

=== Big West ===
The Big West lost San Jose State and UNLV to the WAC after the 1995 season. Big West member Pacific dropped football citing financial concerns. Arkansas State, Louisiana Tech, Northern Illinois, and Southwestern Louisiana had joined the Big West as football affiliate members for the 1993 season, but left ahead of the 1996 season. That meant the Big West was losing seven of its ten football programs ahead of the 1996 season. The Big West was able to bring its football numbers back up to six programs by inviting Boise State, Idaho, and North Texas as full members to begin in the 1996 season. North Texas had been an independent while Boise State and Idaho had been members of the I-AA Big Sky Conference. Cal Poly SLO from the American West Conference also joined in all sports but football to bring total membership back up to twelve.

== Conference changes ==
School	Former Conference	New Conference
Arkansas State	Big West Conference (Note: Arkansas State, Louisiana Tech, Northern Illinois and Southwestern Louisiana participated in the Big West for football only from 1993–95. In 1996, Cal Poly joined the Big West in basketball and other sports, but remained a I-AA independent in football.)	Division I-A Independent
Baylor	Southwest Conference	Big 12 Conference
Boise State	Big Sky Conference	Big West Conference
Cal Poly SLO	American West Conference	Big West Conference
Colorado	Big Eight Conference	Big 12 Conference
Houston	Southwest Conference	Conference USA
Idaho	Big Sky Conference	Big West Conference
Iowa State	Big Eight Conference	Big 12 Conference
Kansas	Big Eight Conference	Big 12 Conference
Kansas State	Big Eight Conference	Big 12 Conference
Louisiana Tech	Big West Conference	Division I-A Independent
Missouri	Big Eight Conference	Big 12 Conference
Nebraska	Big Eight Conference	Big 12 Conference
North Texas	Division I-A Independent	Big West Conference
Northern Illinois	Big West Conference	Division I-A Independent
Oklahoma	Big Eight Conference	Big 12 Conference
Oklahoma State	Big Eight Conference	Big 12 Conference
Rice	Southwest Conference	Western Athletic Conference
San Jose State	Big West Conference	Western Athletic Conference
SMU	Southwest Conference	Western Athletic Conference
Southwestern Louisiana (Note: Now known as Louisiana.)	Big West Conference	Division I-A Independent
TCU	Southwest Conference	Western Athletic Conference
Texas	Southwest Conference	Big 12 Conference
Texas A&M	Southwest Conference	Big 12 Conference
Texas Tech	Southwest Conference	Big 12 Conference
Tulsa	Missouri Valley Conference	Western Athletic Conference
UNLV	Big West Conference	Western Athletic Conference

== See also ==
- 2005 NCAA conference realignment
- 2010–2014 NCAA conference realignment
- 2021–2024 NCAA conference realignment
