= 2005 NCAA conference realignment =

Changes in US college athletic conferences

The 2005 NCAA conference realignment was initiated by the movement of three Big East Conference teams (Boston College, University of Miami, and Virginia Tech) to the Atlantic Coast Conference, which set events into motion that created a realignment in college football, as 23 teams changed conferences and Army became an independent. The ACC would solidify itself as a premier power conference in college football, Conference USA would be forced to undergo a major restructuring, and the Big East, despite its attempted backfill, would further decline, directly resulting in the 2010–2014 NCAA conference realignment.

== Affected conferences ==
=== Big East Conference ===
In 2003 the Big East was put on watch as the ACC announced plans to expand from nine teams to twelve, which under NCAA rules would have enabled them to hold a special conference championship football game. Miami, Syracuse, and BC were rumored to be the three schools under consideration, and all three met with officials from the ACC regarding membership. At the same time, the Big East itself was contemplating its future.

Led by Connecticut Attorney General Richard Blumenthal, the football schools that would be left behind under this initial plan — UConn, Pittsburgh, Rutgers, Virginia Tech, and West Virginia — filed two lawsuits, one against the ACC, and the other against Miami and BC, accusing them of improper disclosure of confidential information and of conspiring to weaken the Big East. Syracuse was not named as a defendant in part because they made no public comments about the ongoing situation.

Leaked minutes of Big East meetings have shed light on the confusing process surrounding the defection of three of its members. At a summer meeting of the "football schools", following the announced departures of Miami and Virginia Tech, discussion among the Presidents and Athletic Directors of the remaining schools focused on a potential split into two conferences; an all-sports conference including football, and a second conference focused primarily on basketball. The idea of a 16-team superconference of both basketball and football schools was discussed, as was merging with Conference USA. Minutes of a July 9, 2003 meeting of presidents and athletic directors held before any detailed review of the conference's options show that Syracuse Athletic Director Jake Crouthamel and BC Athletic Director Gene DeFilippo went on record indicating they would resign their positions if the Big East expanded to 16 teams.

In response to a proposal for the establishment of a binding agreement, the six schools agreed to a $5 million exit fee and 27-month notice requirement. Meanwhile, the Big East presidents agreed to meet with and possibly extend invitations to Penn State and Notre Dame. However, neither school showed interest in joining the conference. The minutes show the presidents unanimously voted to support an eventual conference invitation for the University of Louisville, and to begin due diligence on Louisville and other proposed new members. Several models for a new conference were discussed; and it was decided that the football schools would explore separating from the basketball-only schools to establish an eight-team all-sports conference. The presidents and athletic directors described the breakup of the football and basketball schools as "inevitable".

Additional meetings of the football conference members occurred between July and October 2003. In the course of those meetings, it was realized that the break-up scenario would not be feasible because the new football conference would lose its automatic NCAA basketball tournament berth and possibly its BCS bid, as well as the Big East name. Further, the football schools had not been together long enough to satisfy certain NCAA rules.

At a Big East meeting in Newark, New Jersey on October 1, 2003, after a discussion of Notre Dame's concerns for stability, BC president Rev. William P. Leahy, S.J., addressed rumors surrounding BC's intentions toward the Big East. Fr. Leahy conceded that BC might indeed be leaving the conference, and he would determine how genuine the ACC's reported interest in having any school as a 12th member. He stated he could not agree to an exit penalty larger than the already agreed to $5,000,000, and expressed concerns about academic issues at Louisville and Cincinnati that emerged prior to doing due diligence. It was decided that the conference would add the additional football and basketball schools and continue in its existing structure until such time as the football schools could establish their own conference. Unhappy with the vote on the future structure of the conference, the administration of BC continued discussions with the ACC.

In response to losing three football programs, the Big East Conference extended invitations to five schools from Conference USA in order to replenish their football ranks and to create a 16-team basketball superconference. The schools that left Conference USA on July 1, 2005, for the Big East are:

- University of Cincinnati
- DePaul University (non-football school)
- University of Louisville
- Marquette University (non-football school)
- University of South Florida

The fallout from the Conference USA realignment instigated a chain reaction of conference realignments that affected the WAC, MAC, Sun Belt, Mountain West, and Atlantic 10 conferences. At the same time, the UConn Huskies completed their leap to Division I-A football and became a full member of the conference in 2004, resulting in their first-ever bowl bid.

=== Atlantic Coast Conference ===
Miami had been dissatisfied with the Big East and its leadership since a formal letter of complaint was issued by Miami to Big East Commissioner Mike Tranghese in 1999. Their issues went unresolved, leading to Miami's interest in the ACC — a league that had been pursuing the college football superpower since the mid-1990s, at the request of football-oriented Clemson, Florida State, Georgia Tech, and Virginia. Those schools were concerned with the balance of power in the ACC, which they viewed as tilted towards "Tobacco Road", the nickname given to the four charter member North Carolina ACC schools and their nationally prominent basketball programs.

Talks with Syracuse indicated that it would likely leave the Big East, but doubts arose when Syracuse basketball coach Jim Boeheim publicly expressed his disapproval of a conference change, even as Syracuse and ACC officials proceeded with the formalities of official campus visits. Miami and Boston College were unwavering in their interest in the ACC, and Virginia Tech made it clear that they had long wanted to join the ACC. Finally, in a last-minute about-face, due in large measure to political pressure applied by Governor Mark Warner of Virginia on the conference and member institution University of Virginia, the ACC replaced Syracuse with Virginia Tech in its expansion vote. Things became even more surprising when, reached by phone at a conference in Switzerland, then-N.C. State Chancellor Marye Anne Fox cast a last-minute "no" vote against BC. As a result, the ACC extended invitations only to Miami and Virginia Tech. Virginia Tech immediately accepted the invitation and filed court papers to get themselves out of the awkward position of suing their new conference. Miami, stunned by the outcome of the vote, delayed their acceptance until the last possible day. Miami President Donna Shalala explained the delay stating "We had numbers on BC-Virginia Tech. We had done numbers on Miami alone. But we had not anticipated that Virginia Tech and Miami would be the only two invitees." The remaining four plaintiffs removed BC from the list of defendants and asked both BC and Syracuse to join their suit. Both declined.

Speculation that Chancellor Fox, a Notre Dame trustee, cast her initial vote against BC so that the ACC might consider extending membership to Notre Dame was fueled by press accounts reporting that a bid to the Fighting Irish was imminent. But in mid-October 2003, the ACC voted unanimously to invite BC to be its twelfth member, although because of timing issues BC was not able to compete in the ACC until the 2005–2006 season. When BC accepted they were returned to the lawsuit still pending against Miami by several Big East schools. After expansion, Jake Crouthamel retired as athletic director at Syracuse.

=== Conference USA ===
Conference USA saw radical changes for the 2005–06 academic year. The stage for these changes was set in 2003, when the Atlantic Coast Conference successfully lured Miami and Virginia Tech to make a move from the Big East Conference in 2004. Boston College would later make the same move, joining the ACC in 2005. In response to that series of moves, which depleted the Big East football conference, the Big East looked to Conference USA to attract replacements. Five C-USA members departed for the Big East, including three football-playing schools (Cincinnati, Louisville, and USF) and two non-football schools (DePaul and Marquette). Another two schools (Charlotte and Saint Louis) left for the Atlantic 10; TCU joined the Mountain West; and a ninth member, Army, which was C-USA football-only, opted to become an independent in that sport again.

With the loss of these teams, C-USA lured six teams from other conferences: UCF and Marshall from the MAC, as well as Rice, SMU, Tulsa, and later UTEP from the WAC. Note that UCF played in the MAC for football only; for all other sports, it was a member of the Atlantic Sun Conference.

With C-USA's membership now consisting of 12 schools, all of which sponsored football, the conference adopted a two-division alignment.

C-USA's men's soccer program also was affected. South Carolina (which had been part of the Metro prior to 1995 reunification for men's soccer only but not invited to the reunified C-USA, but had been part of that conference from 1983 to 1991 for most sports, and had played as an independent in men's soccer since 1995) rejoined the reunified conference, bringing along fellow Southeastern Conference member Kentucky (Mid-American Conference) to the men's soccer program. Florida International also joined for men's soccer, but by 2013 became an all-sports C-USA member.

=== Atlantic 10 Conference ===
The Atlantic 10 Conference welcomed two teams from Conference USA: Charlotte and Saint Louis.

=== Mid-American Conference ===
The Mid-American Conference lost Central Florida (football only), Kentucky (men's soccer only), and Marshall to Conference USA. Central Florida had been a member of the MAC because their primary conference, the Atlantic Sun, did not sponsor football while Kentucky, which had been a Mid-American Conference member for men's soccer because the Southeastern Conference does not sponsor the sport, chose to join Conference USA to create a natural rivalry with the other Southeastern Conference school, South Carolina, which also joined at the same time.

=== Mountain West Conference ===
The Mountain West Conference welcomed TCU, who had left the WAC in 2001 for Conference USA. TCU rejoined eight former Western Athletic Conference opponents as the ninth member of the Mountain West in 2005 following the fallout in Conference USA.

=== Western Athletic Conference ===
As Conference USA sought new members to replenish its ranks, Rice, SMU, Tulsa, and UTEP joined Conference USA. In response, the Western Athletic Conference added three more universities (all land-grant schools), with two from the Big West (playing football in the Sun Belt — Idaho and Utah State). New Mexico State was also added from the Sun Belt.

=== Sun Belt Conference ===
From the Sun Belt Conference, New Mexico State and football-only members Idaho and Utah State departed for the WAC. Troy was added soon after, and a year later FAU and FIU joined from the I-AA ranks.

=== Big West Conference ===
The Big West Conference lost two members, the University of Idaho and Utah State University, to the Western Athletic Conference.

== Aftermath ==
=== Athletic consequences ===
For the ACC, the expansion has been a mixed bag. The financial revenue from television has increased, and are slated to increase even more when a new contract with ESPN takes effect. For the three schools that came from the Big East, financial distributions from the ACC are much greater than they were in the Big East. A benefit for the original members is that the ACC is now able to host a football conference championship game and has a guaranteed New Year's Six bowl tie in with the Orange Bowl. However, since the inaugural game in 2005 box office receipts and TV ratings for the football championship have declined. This was generally attributed to the fact that the conference's two Florida based teams were not playing in games in Jacksonville and Tampa. Beginning in 2010, the game was moved to Charlotte, NC, a location more central to the ACC membership, but arguably less of a destination city.

Although the move was due to football, the Big East and its football-sponsoring successor, the American Athletic Conference, have not won a national championship in football after the 2005 realignments (though UCF was ranked #1 by Colley Matrix in 2017), and the ACC has only won three times, partly due to the concurrent rise of the Southeastern Conference as the NCAA's pre-eminent football power conference (an SEC member school was the consensus FBS national champion in each season from 2006 to 2012). The ACC's three football national championships since 2005 have been Florida State's 2013 championship over Auburn and Clemson's 2016 championship and 2018 championship over Alabama. The ACC's last national championship prior to the realignment was in 1999, when Florida State beat future ACC member (and then Big East member) Virginia Tech in the 2000 Sugar Bowl. The Big East's last national championship came in 2001, when future ACC member Miami beat Nebraska in the 2002 Rose Bowl. Ironically, since 2005, the ACC and the Big East/American have combined to win nine D-I men's basketball championships: Virginia in 2019, North Carolina in 2009 and 2017, Duke in 2010 and 2015, UConn in 2011, 2014, and 2023, and Louisville in 2013 (although Louisville's title has since been vacated due to massive violations of NCAA rules).

=== Further Big East/American-ACC conference shifts ===
Despite not being initially invited to the ACC in 2003, Syracuse would eventually apply for and be accepted for membership into the ACC on September 18, 2011. Joining Syracuse in the ACC would be Pittsburgh, which was considered somewhat ironic due to the aforementioned lawsuit in which Pittsburgh was a plaintiff against the ACC in 2003. Both Syracuse and Pittsburgh joined the ACC in 2013. With West Virginia leaving the Big East for the Big 12 Conference in 2012 and Rutgers joining the Big Ten Conference alongside ACC charter member Maryland in 2014, UConn was the only Big East school that participated in the lawsuit scheduled to remain with the original Big East beyond 2013, with two of those schools—Virginia Tech and Pittsburgh—now part of the ACC.

In another Big East-to-ACC defection, Notre Dame announced a major shift away from the Big East on September 12, 2012, formally joining the ACC as a conference member in all sports but football starting as early as 2014. While Notre Dame's football program retained nominal independence, the agreement included a commitment by the Fighting Irish to field five games per year against ACC opponents in future schedules. Pittsburgh, Miami, Boston College, North Carolina, and Georgia Tech all have traditional rivalries with Notre Dame (especially Pittsburgh and like-minded Boston College), although Notre Dame was forced to put its rivalry with Big Ten powerhouse Michigan on hold after 2014 due to the move. On March 12, 2013, Notre Dame and the Big East reached agreement on the Irish departure date of July 1, 2013.

Due to the various shifts in conference affiliation, on December 15, 2012, the seven remaining non-FBS Big East schools, all Catholic institutions—DePaul, Georgetown, Marquette, Providence, St. John's, Seton Hall, and Villanova—announced that they had voted unanimously to leave the Big East Conference, effective June 30, 2015. Further negotiations between the so-called "Catholic 7" and the remaining Big East members ended in an agreement that these schools would depart at the end of the 2012–13 school year. The split left what remained of the Big East primarily focused on football. The "Catholic 7" retained the Big East name, and the FBS schools adopted the American Athletic Conference moniker.

Following Maryland's departure to the Big Ten in 2014 with American member Rutgers, Louisville, another American member, defected to the ACC. This was considered an ironic turn of events after Boston College, now an ACC member, accepted Louisville into the conference despite criticizing Big East leadership for pursue Louisville due to academic concerns. Cincinnati, another American member, boasted a stronger academic profile and though failed to receive an ACC membership did eventually acquire an invitation to join the Big 12 in 2021.

== Conference changes ==
School	Former Conference	New Conference
Boston College	Big East	ACC
Virginia Tech	Big East	ACC
Miami	Big East	ACC
Charlotte	Conference USA	Atlantic 10
Saint Louis	Conference USA	Atlantic 10
Cincinnati	Conference USA	Big East
DePaul	Conference USA	Big East
Louisville	Conference USA	Big East
Marquette	Conference USA	Big East
USF	Conference USA	Big East
Marshall	MAC	Conference USA
UCF	MAC (football only); Atlantic Sun	Conference USA
Rice	WAC	Conference USA
SMU	WAC	Conference USA
Tulsa	WAC	Conference USA
UTEP	WAC	Conference USA
Army	Conference USA	Independent
TCU	Conference USA	Mountain West
FAU	Division I-AA independent Atlantic Sun	Sun Belt (Note: FAU joined Sun Belt football in 2005, with the rest of the athletic program joining in 2006.)
FIU	Division I-AA independent	Sun Belt (Note: FIU had been a full but non-football Sun Belt member since 1998.)
Troy	Division I-A independent Atlantic Sun	Sun Belt (Note: Troy joined Sun Belt football in 2004, with the rest of the athletic program joining in 2005.)
Idaho	Sun Belt (football only); Big West	WAC
New Mexico State	Sun Belt	WAC
Utah State	Sun Belt (football only); Big West	WAC

== See also ==
- 1996 NCAA conference realignment
- 2010–2014 NCAA conference realignment
- 2021–2024 NCAA conference realignment
- NCAA Division I conference realignment
