= List of college rivalries in the United States =

In the United States, college rivalries are a prominent aspect of intercollegiate sports. These rivalries are characterized by a long-standing history of competitiveness that extends beyond the athletes on the field, often affecting the larger communities associated with the institutions.

The list below categorizes rivalries within sports conferences. Notably, some rivalries, such as the Indiana–Kentucky rivalry, occur between schools from different conferences.

== By athletic conference ==
=== ACC rivalries ===
Basketball and football are typically the focus of sports rivalries in the Atlantic Coast Conference (ACC), though schools find themselves in rivalries across all sports, including baseball and lacrosse. Notable rivalries include:

==== All sports ====
Conference

- Tobacco Road (Duke Blue Devils/NC State Wolfpack/North Carolina Tar Heels/Wake Forest Demon Deacons)
- Duke–North Carolina rivalry
- North Carolina–NC State rivalry
- Virginia–Virginia Tech rivalry
- South's Oldest Rivalry (North Carolina vs Virginia)
- Syracuse–Boston College
- California–Stanford

Non-conference

- Green Line Rivalry (Boston College vs Boston U.)
- Kentucky–Louisville rivalry
- Syracuse–UConn rivalry
- The Keg of Nails (Cincinnati–Louisville)

==== Basketball ====
Conference

- North Carolina vs. Duke
- NC State vs. North Carolina
- NC State vs. Wake Forest

Non-conference

- Commonwealth Classic (Boston College vs UMass) – first played in 1905.
- Backyard Brawl (Pittsburgh vs West Virginia) – first played 1905.
- Duke vs. Maryland
- Duke–Michigan men's basketball rivalry – first played in 1963.
- Kentucky–Louisville Rivalry (Louisville vs. Kentucky)
- The City Game (Pittsburgh vs Duquesne) – first played in 1932.
- Syracuse vs. Georgetown

==== Football ====
Conference

- Boston College vs. Virginia Tech – first played in 1993.
- California vs. Stanford – Became an ACC rivalry when the two schools joined in 2024. First played in 1892, and most famous for the surreal ending to their 1982 matchup.
- Clemson–Georgia Tech football rivalry – first played in 1898.
- Clemson vs. Florida State – first played in 1970.
- Commonwealth Cup (Virginia vs. Virginia Tech) – first played in 1895, the trophy was created in 1996.
- Florida State vs Miami – first played in 1951.
- Jefferson–Eppes Trophy (Virginia vs. Florida State) – first played in 1992, while the trophy was created in 1995.
- Miami vs. Virginia Tech – first played in 1953.
- North Carolina–Wake Forest rivalry – the oldest rivalry in the state of North Carolina, first played in 1888.
- North Carolina–NC State football rivalry (NC State vs. North Carolina) – first played in 1894.
- NC State vs. Wake Forest – the ACC's longest continuously played rivalry, since 1910, first played in 1895.
- O'Rourke–McFadden Trophy (Clemson vs. Boston College) – first played in 1940, the trophy was first awarded in 2008.
- Pittsburgh–Syracuse football rivalry – first played in 1916.
- South's Oldest Rivalry (Virginia vs. North Carolina) – the ACC's and the South's oldest rivalry, first played in 1892.
- Textile Bowl (Clemson vs. NC State) – First played in 1899.
- Victory Bell (Duke–North Carolina) (North Carolina vs. Duke) – first played in 1888, the Victory Bell trophy was first awarded 1948.

Non-conference

- Auburn–Clemson football rivalry – first played in 1899.
- Auburn–Georgia Tech football rivalry – first played in 1892.
- Backyard Brawl (Pittsburgh vs. West Virginia) – first played in 1895.
- Battle of Bristol (Tennessee vs. Virginia Tech) – first played in 1897, currently holds the record for most attended football game 156,990 in attendance at Bristol Motor Speedway. September 10, 2016
- Beltway Brawl (Maryland vs. Virginia) – first played in 1919.
- Boston College–Holy Cross football rivalry – first played in 1896.
- Boston College–UMass football rivalry – first played in 1899.
- Clean, Old-Fashioned Hate (Georgia Tech vs. Georgia) – first played in 1893.
- Clemson–Georgia football rivalry – first played in 1897.
- Clemson–South Carolina rivalry – first played in 1896.
- Florida–Florida State football rivalry – first played in 1958.
- Florida–Miami football rivalry – first played in 1938.
- Gansz Trophy (SMU vs. Navy) – first played in 1930, but meetings were infrequent until the 1990s, and the trophy dates only to 2009.
- Governor's Cup (Louisville vs. Kentucky) – first played in 1912, but the modern football rivalry did not begin until 1994. The 1994 meeting was the first between the teams in 70 years.
- Holy War (Boston College vs. Notre Dame) – first played in 1975.
- Miami–Nebraska football rivalry – first played in 1951, four national titles have been decided from bowl games between these teams.
- Penn State–Pittsburgh football rivalry – first played in 1893.
- Penn State–Syracuse football rivalry – first played in 1922.
- Pittsburgh–Notre Dame football rivalry – first played 1899.
- River City Rivalry (Pittsburgh vs Cincinnati) – first played in 2005
- Safeway Bowl (SMU vs. North Texas) – first played in 1922, but had long hiatuses from 1943–1973, 1993–2005, and 2008–2013, and went on hiatus again after SMU joined the ACC in 2024.
- SMU–Rice football rivalry – first played in 1916; played almost every year from 1926–2023 before SMU joined the ACC.
- SMU–TCU football rivalry (aka Battle for the Iron Skillet) – first played in 1915.
- Syracuse–West Virginia football rivalry – first played in 1945.
- Virginia Tech–West Virginia football rivalry – first played in 1912.

=== America East rivalries ===
Basketball is typically the focus of sports rivalries in the America East Conference, though schools find themselves in rivalries across all sports, including baseball and lacrosse. Notable rivalries include:

- University at Albany and Binghamton University, also known as the I-88 Rivalry because of their geographic proximity.
- University at Albany and University of Vermont mostly in men's basketball, due to the successes these two teams have had in the 2000s.
- University at Albany and University of Maryland, Baltimore County in women's volleyball and men's lacrosse.
- University of New Hampshire and University of Maine, more notorious for its hockey rivalry, the Maine–New Hampshire rivalry bleeds into other sports as well. The schools' football rivalry is a conference clash in CAA Football, the technically separate football arm of the Coastal Athletic Association.

Non-conference

- Albany–Siena rivalry – first meeting was in 1940.
- University at Albany and Stony Brook University – This was a conference rivalry until Stony Brook left the AmEast for the all-sports CAA in 2022. Their football rivalry, known as the Empire Clash, has been a conference matchup since 2013, when both schools joined CAA Football.
- Central Connecticut–Hartford rivalry, a rivalry started in basketball is now starting to gain popularity in baseball.
- University of Hartford and University of Maryland, Baltimore County in both men's and women's basketball until Hartford moved to NCAA Division III in 2023.
- Stony Brook University and University of Vermont, mostly in men's basketball, due to the successes these two teams have had in the 2010s. It became a non-conference matchup when Stony Brook joined the all-sports CAA in 2022.

=== Big East rivalries ===
The Big East Conference, founded as a basketball conference, is a league of 11 Division I schools, with only University of Connecticut playing FBS–level football. The conference, while centered in the northeast, is also geographically diverse, stretching from Nebraska to New England. Current rivalries include:

- Butler Bulldogs and Xavier Musketeers – among the most successful Division I men's basketball programs in the 21st century, the two schools were founding members of the Midwestern Collegiate Conference, and were also two of the three Midwestern schools invited to join the Big East at its relaunch in 2013.
- DePaul Blue Demons and Marquette Golden Eagles – originally Division I independents, both joined Conference USA and the original Big East at the same time, and are among the "Catholic 7" that formed the current Big East after breaking away from the former members of the conference who all sponsored Division I Football Bowl Subdivision-level football. One of several sports rivalries involving teams from Chicago and Milwaukee, alongside the Brewers–Cubs rivalry and (by proxy) the Bears–Packers rivalry. The rivalry reached its zenith in the late 1970s, when both DePaul and Marquette were national powers. However, the rivalry has, as of late, heavily favored Marquette, with the Milwaukee school winning approximately four out of every five meetings since the early 1990s.
- Georgetown Hoyas and St. John's Red Storm' — these two "Catholic 7" schools, neither of which plays Division I FBS football (Georgetown plays in Division I FCS, and St. John's has no football program), had their basketball teams rise to prominence in the 1980s, having numerous meetings that impacted the NCAA Championship as well as the Big East title. Both teams were known for their charismatic coaches, John Thompson at Georgetown and Lou Carnesecca at St. John's. Rivalry has declined in recent years. This rivalry has also influenced other sports, as the two schools' baseball teams opened Citi Field on March 29, 2009 with the third game of a three-game series that started at Georgetown. The Hoyas won the game, and the series.
- Georgetown–UConn men's basketball rivalry — first game played between the two schools took place on December 22, 1958.
- Georgetown Hoyas and Villanova Wildcats — these two Division I FCS football schools share an intense rivalry in basketball, stemming from Villanova's defeat of John Thompson's Hoya team in the 1985 NCAA championship game. The rivalry takes on a religious tone as Augustinian (Villanova) versus Jesuit (Georgetown). Jokes about the opposing orders fly back and forth during the week preceding Villanova–Georgetown. In recent years the rivalry has undergone somewhat of a revival, with both teams enjoying success in the regular season and recent NCAA tournaments. This rivalry continues in the reconfigured Big East.
- Providence Friars and Villanova Wildcats — the two smallest schools in the original Big East battle each year. The rivalry is also elevated by the Catholic orders which run the schools; Providence's Dominicans and Villanova's Augustinians.
- St. John's Red Storm and Seton Hall Pirates – two local "Catholic 7" schools battle every year in basketball. New York vs New Jersey bragging rights are on the line as well as competing for many local basketball recruits in the area.

Non-conference

- Notre Dame–UConn women's basketball rivalry – a rivalry that started in the 1990s when both schools were members of the original Big East, intensified in the 2000–01 season with three pivotal matchups (one of which became the focal point of a published book, Bird at the Buzzer), and became nationally significant in the 21st century, especially after UConn's rivalry with Tennessee went on a 13-year hiatus. Notre Dame was responsible for more than half of UConn's losses from 2011 to 2019 (8 out of 15).
- Ocean State Rivalry a college basketball rivalry that started in 1920 between Providence College and the University of Rhode Island.
- Rutgers–UConn women's basketball rivalry – a rivalry that intensified after Tennessee stopped scheduling Rutgers in non–conference play.
- Stanford–UConn women's basketball rivalry – another nationally significant rivalry, with five of their 18 total meetings coming in the Final Four.
- Tennessee–UConn women's basketball rivalry – the women's basketball rivalry between the University of Tennessee Lady Volunteers and the University of Connecticut Huskies is one of the fiercest rivalries in college basketball, and perhaps the only one to reach national consciousness out of the women's game. This rivalry was halted in 2007 due to a falling-out between the schools' head coaches (respectively Pat Summitt and Geno Auriemma), and did not resume until 2020 (four years after Summitt's death).

=== Big Ten rivalries ===
The 18 universities that are part of the Big Ten Conference, most of which are located in the Midwestern United States, have more rivalries with each other than universities in other conferences. These include:

==== Basketball ====
- University of Illinois vs Indiana University
- University of Illinois vs University of Iowa
- Indiana University vs Purdue University
- University of Iowa vs University of Nebraska–Lincoln
- University of Michigan vs Michigan State University

==== Football ====
- Indiana University and Michigan State University – Old Brass Spittoon
- Michigan State University and Pennsylvania State University – Land Grant Trophy
- Northwestern University and University of Illinois – competed for the Sweet Sioux Tomahawk from 1945 through 2008. Because of NCAA rules regarding Native American imagery, the trophy has been retired, with the schools competing for the new Land of Lincoln Trophy from 2009 onward. It became one of the 12 "protected" rivalry games in Big Ten football after Oregon, Washington, UCLA, and USC joined the conference in 2024.
- Ohio State University and University of Illinois – Illibuck (a statue of a turtle)
- Ohio State University and Pennsylvania State University – there is no trophy, but these teams play every year in the Big Ten through the 2023 season, after which it is played twice in a four-year cycle. The first meeting between these two teams dates back to the early 1900s. Due to recent scandals with both programs, Ohio State vacated their 2010 victory due to the tattoo scandal. Some of these games can lead to conference championships and decide the college playoffs
- Ohio State University, Pennsylvania State University and University of Michigan – Creator's Trophy (Lacrosse) Winner of two games takes the trophy. Trophy stays where it is if all teams are all 1–1.
- Pennsylvania State University and Rutgers University – Friendship Cup (Lacrosse)
- Purdue University and Indiana University – Old Oaken Bucket (football), The Crimson & Gold Cup (all sports). Notably, Indiana–Purdue had been the only "protected" cross-divisional game in Big Ten football from its 2014 expansion to 14 members to its 2024 expansion to 18, and remains a protected rivalry after the Big Ten eliminated its football divisions in 2024. See Indiana–Purdue rivalry.
- University of Illinois and Purdue University – Purdue Cannon. Also a protected rivalry from 2024 on.
- University of Illinois and University of Michigan – Illinois–Michigan football series. There is no trophy here, but the first meeting between these two teams dates back to 1898.
- University of Iowa and University of Minnesota – Floyd of Rosedale (a bronze statue of a pig); also a protected post-2023 rivalry.
- University of Iowa and University of Wisconsin – Heartland Trophy (a bronze statue of a bull); also a protected post-2023 rivalry.
- University of Iowa and University of Nebraska – Heroes Trophy; also a protected post-2023 rivalry.
- University of Maryland and Rutgers University – is an annually contested Big Ten rivalry (primarily in football) between schools that became conference foes in 2014, as they are the only Big Ten schools in the North East.
- University of Michigan and Ohio State University – ESPN calls the Michigan–Ohio State rivalry the greatest sports rivalry of the 20th century. According to legend, its history can be traced back to the Toledo War. The rivalry between the two schools is simply known as "The Game", no trophy is awarded to the winner of the game. Also a protected post-2023 rivalry.
- University of Michigan and Michigan State University – Paul Bunyan Trophy; also a protected post-2023 rivalry.
- University of Michigan and University of Minnesota – The Little Brown Jug
- University of Michigan and Pennsylvania State University – there is no trophy, but the teams have been rivals since Penn State joined the Big Ten due to their similar football histories.
- University of Minnesota and Pennsylvania State University – Governor's Victory Bell
- University of Minnesota and University of Wisconsin – Paul Bunyan's Axe This is the oldest and most played rivalry in the NCAA Football Bowl Subdivision. It is also a protected post-2023 rivalry.
- University of Minnesota and University of Nebraska – $5 Bits of Broken Chair Trophy
- University of Oregon and University of Washington – (football) a rivalry between two of the four programs in the Pacific Northwest described as one of the "most temperamental cross-state rivalries". Both moved together to the Big Ten in 2024, and their football rivalry is another of the Big Ten's "protected" matchups.
- Los Angeles: University of Southern California (USC) and University of California, Los Angeles (UCLA) (all sports) In (football): The Crosstown Showdown for the Victory Bell, and carrying over to the Big Ten. (See UCLA–USC rivalry)

=== Big 12 rivalries ===
Current rivalries in the Big 12 Conference include:

- Arizona and Arizona State – The rivalry trophy for the football rivalry between the two largest universities in that state, the Territorial Cup, has been certified by the NCAA as the oldest rivalry trophy in that sport, having been first awarded in 1899. However, the Cup did not change hands as a regular part of the rivalry until 2001. Nonetheless, the football teams continued to play on a semi-regular basis until 1949, when the rivalry became an annual affair. In 2009, the schools created an all-sports competition between them, the Territorial Cup Series. The two schools have been in the same conference since 1931—first in the Border Conference, then in the Western Athletic Conference, followed by the Pac-12 and now the Big 12. The football rivalry is one of only four "protected" (i.e., guaranteed annual) rivalries in the Big 12 following its 2024 expansion.
- Baylor and TCU have one of the oldest rivalries between any two institutions, religious or otherwise. The two schools compete across the entire span of competitions that the Big 12 sponsors. For instance, in FBS football TCU currently leads Baylor 59–53–7 across 115 games played since 1899. The rivalry became especially heated after the formation of the Big 12, with TCU supporters accusing Baylor of playing politics to keep TCU out of that conference. The rivals were reunited in the early 2010s conference realignment. The "Revivalry" is another of the Big 12's protected post-2023 football rivalries.
- BYU and Utah – (all sports: see BYU–Utah rivalry). The football version, now a protected Big 12 rivalry, is known as the "Holy War", with the teams competing. Further heat was added to the BYU–Utah rivalry in 2024 when Utah joined BYU in the Big 12.
- Texas Tech University and Texas Christian University (TCU) – one of the biggest rivalries in the Big 12. Both athletic directors have stated that they were in a rivalry. Every year these two teams play for the Saddle Trophy. Texas Tech and TCU are definitely each others biggest rivals making this one of the most prolific rivalries in college football. It once again became an annual matchup when TCU joined the Big 12 Conference with Texas Tech, but was not protected when the Big 12 expanded to 16 members in 2024.
- Sunflower Showdown (University of Kansas vs. Kansas State University) – The Sunflower Showdown includes all athletic events between the two schools. The Governor's Cup is awarded to the victor of the football game, which is the last of the conference's post-2023 protected rivalries.
- University of Cincinnati and University of Central Florida (UCF) — A relatively new rivalry, with the first meeting in 2015, but quickly became nationally significant, with the two teams frequently contending for the one New Year's Six bowl berth awarded to a champion of a Group of Five league during the four-team era of the College Football Playoff, with both being members of the American Athletic Conference, The two schools joined the Big 12 in 2023.
- West Virginia University and University of Cincinnati — The rivalry dates from their first college football game in 1921, and has continued across all sports, including basketball since 1940. The schools are around 300 miles (480 km) apart from one another. The rivalry intensified while the two schools were conference foes and members of the Big East Conference.

Other current rivalries involving Big 12 schools include:

- Bedlam Series (University of Oklahoma vs. Oklahoma State University) – The Bedlam Series encompasses all athletic contests between the two schools. Both schools announced that the rivalry would end (apart from occasional future matchups) once Oklahoma joined the Southeastern Conference (SEC) in 2024.
- University of Texas at Austin and Texas Tech University – since 1996, the Chancellor's Spurs have been awarded to the annual winner of this football game. Likely to become infrequent in many sports with Texas now in the SEC.
- Texas Christian University (TCU) and Southern Methodist University (SMU) – college football's Battle for the Iron Skillet is one of the most intense private school rivalries in the nation. Although this is now a non-conference rivalry, with TCU in the Big 12 and SMU in the Atlantic Coast Conference, the football rivalry continues to this day.
- West Virginia University and University of Maryland – a traditional football "Border War", dating back to 1919. The rivalry continued even though both schools have long been in separate conferences. (See also Maryland–West Virginia football rivalry.)
- West Virginia University and University of Pittsburgh – While historically a rivalry between the two schools' football programs, the term "Backyard Brawl" has also been used to refer to college basketball games played annually or semi-annually and may also be used to refer to other athletic competitions between the two schools.
- Chisholm Trail Rivalry (Kansas State University vs. University of Texas at Austin – since 1913, the Chisholm Trail Rivalry has been played between Texas and Kansas State, with the Kansas State Wildcats holding a one-game edge (10–9) over the Texas Longhorns. Also likely to become infrequent with Texas now in the SEC.

Former Big 12 rivalries that are now dormant due to conference realignment in the early 2010s include:

- Baylor University and Texas A&M University – College football's Battle of the Brazos. Ended for the time being when A&M moved to the SEC in 2012.
- Iowa State University and University of Missouri – From 1959 to 2011, the Telephone Trophy was awarded to the annual winner of this football game. The football rivalry ended when Missouri joined the SEC in 2012.
- University of Kansas and University of Missouri – The Border War includes all athletic events between the two schools. The rivalry ostensibly traces its roots to the 1850s, when skirmishes – widely known as "border wars" – between the two states marked the beginning of the Civil War. Before Missouri's departure for the SEC, this was the oldest continuous football rivalry west of the Mississippi, and the second oldest in Division I FBS history. The football teams played in 2025 for the first time since Missouri's SEC move, and are scheduled to play again in 2026, 2029, and 2030.
- University of Missouri and University of Nebraska – Before realignment, the Missouri–Nebraska football rivalry was the second-oldest football rivalry in the Big 12 Conference and third-oldest rivalry west of the Mississippi River. Nebraska's 2011 move to the Big Ten and Missouri's 2012 move to the SEC put an end to the rivalry.
- University of Oklahoma and University of Nebraska – this rivalry was once one of the most storied rivalries in the history of college football, highlighted by the 1971 "Game of the Century" between #1 Nebraska and #2 Oklahoma. However, the rivalry diminished somewhat after the creation of the Big 12 in 1996 placed the two teams in different divisions, meaning that the game was no longer played annually. It ended for the time being once Nebraska joined the Big Ten. The rivalry temporarily resumed with Oklahoma hosting Nebraska in 2021 and Nebraska hosting Oklahoma in 2022.
- University of Texas at Austin and Texas A&M University – The Lone Star Showdown involves all athletic contests between the two schools. After A&M moved to the SEC, the football teams did not play again until UT joined the conference in 2024.
- Texas Tech University and Texas A&M University – The Texas A&M–Texas Tech football rivalry dates to 1927 spanning 70 football games. Texas A&M's move to the SEC ended games between the two rivals in 2011.

=== Coastal Athletic Association rivalries ===
Rivalries in the Coastal Athletic Association (CAA) and its technically separate football arm of CAA Football include:

- The College of William & Mary and University of Richmond (CAA Football only). Football rivalry dates to 1898 and is named the Capital Cup. Became a non-conference rivalry for 2025 only, with Richmond moving football to the Patriot League, and was renewed in Patriot League football when W&M joined as a football-only member in 2026.
- University of Delaware and Villanova University (CAA Football only). Football rivalry dates to 1895 and is named the Battle of the Blue. Likely become intermittent from 2025 on, with Delaware joining Conference USA. Villanova became a football-only Patriot League member in 2026.
- Hampton University and North Carolina A&T State University, the CAA's only two historically black colleges and universities and two of the few such schools that compete outside of predominantly HBCU conferences. A&T joined the all-sports CAA alongside Hampton and joined CAA Football in 2023.
- Hampton and William & Mary, the former of which joined both sides of the CAA in 2022. Both schools are located on the Virginia Peninsula, the core of the northern portion of the Hampton Roads metropolitan area. The football version becomes a non-conference rivalry in 2026 with W&M's football-only move to the Patriot League.
- Northeastern University and Hofstra University. Basketball team plays for the Frank Barone Trophy after an episode of Everybody Loves Raymond that had the winning football from an NU v HU game.

=== Ivy League and service academy rivalries ===
Rivalries between and among the Ivy League schools and the service academies include:

- United States Naval Academy and Princeton University, a traditional rivalry seen now most evidently in Lightweight Rowing, compete annually for the Murtaugh Cup and Waterpolo where both schools commonly play each for the League Championship. Navy defeated Princeton for the 2009 and 2008 Championship.
- United States Military Academy and Yale University, the proximity of these two institutions and the success of their football programs earlier in the century led to a bitter rivalry.
- Columbia University and Fordham University; two of New York City's three Division I FCS football programs compete annually for the Liberty Cup
- Cornell University and Colgate University, primarily in football and hockey. Colgate's sports teams were named the "Red Raiders" in response to Cornell's "Big Red". Colgate and Cornell have played 119 football games against one another and 127 hockey since 1958; Cornell leads both series.
- Cornell University and Harvard University, primarily a men's ice hockey rivalry
- Cornell University and Hobart College – one of the oldest rivalries in college lacrosse.
- Cornell University and Princeton University – men's lacrosse rivalry dating to 1922; the two school have won at least a share of 42 Ivy League titles; Princeton holds a 35–30–2 advantage in the all-time series.
- Cornell University and University of Pennsylvania – football rivalry dating to 1893; with 122 games, it is the 5th most played college football game. The only year Cornell and Penn did not play was in 1918. For a time played on Thanksgiving; since 1995, the winner has been awarded the Trustees Cup. Penn leads in the series 71–46–5. The Cornell–Penn series is the 2nd longest uninterrupted series played (since 1919).
- Harvard University and Yale University – the season-ending football contest is simply called The Game, dating back to 1875.
- Princeton University and University of Pennsylvania – (men's basketball, Penn–Princeton football rivalry). The 2008 season was the first since 1989 that neither Penn nor Princeton won the Ivy League men's basketball championship.
- United States Merchant Marine Academy and United States Coast Guard Academy – (football) in the Secretaries' Cup.
- United States Military Academy (Army) and United States Naval Academy (Navy) – (football) in the Army–Navy Game (itself part of the Commander-in-Chief's Trophy competition with the United States Air Force Academy (Air Force))

=== Pac-12 rivalries ===
Before its 2024 collapse, the Pac-12 Conference fell neatly into six regional pairings, leading to strong rivalries. Three of these pairs are cross-state rivals, one pair is within the same metropolitan region (San Francisco Bay Area), and one pair vies for bragging rights within the same city (Los Angeles). In 2024, the conference lost all but two of its 12 members, with four joining the Big Ten Conference, four joining the Big 12 Conference, and two joining the Atlantic Coast Conference.

- Arizona: University of Arizona and Arizona State University – (all sports). Plays in the "Duel in the Desert". The two teams compete for the oldest trophy in the nation, The Territorial Cup, given as a reward to the victor of the game. Now a Big 12 rivary.
- Oregon: University of Oregon and Oregon State University – (all sports) in the Oregon–Oregon State football rivalry. This is the seventh-longest rivalry game in college football history. The alumni association of the winning school receives the Platypus Trophy, a wooden trophy that had been lost for more than 40 years before being rediscovered in 2005. The rivalry is likely to become intermittent in the future, with Oregon now in the Big Ten and Oregon State being one of the two remaining Pac-12 members.
- Washington: University of Washington and Washington State University – (all sports). The winner of the annual football game between the two schools wins the Apple Cup. This rivalry now has the same status as the Oregon rivalry, with Washington joining the Big Ten and Washington State in (temporary) conference limbo.
- San Francisco Bay Area: University of California, Berkeley (Cal) and Stanford University (all sports) – in the Big Game (football) for The Stanford Axe. The 1982 incarnation of this matchup involved the celebrated ending known simply as "The Play." Both schools moved together to the ACC.
- Los Angeles: University of Southern California (USC) and University of California, Los Angeles (UCLA) (all sports) In (football): The Crosstown Showdown for the Victory Bell, and carrying over to the Big Ten. (See UCLA–USC rivalry)
- Rocky Mountains: University of Colorado and University of Utah. The Rumble in the Rockies in football was one of the most prominent rivalries from the early to mid-20th century. It was discontinued after 1962, but was revived in 2011 when the two schools were reunited in the Pac-12. The rivalry has carried over to the Big 12, though the football version is no longer annual due to the conference's 2024 expansion.

Other Pac-12 rivalries:

- Oregon State University and Washington State University (all sports) – The only schools that did not leave the Pac-12 in 2024, and the only two members until the addition of seven new members in 2026.
- University of Arizona and University of California, Los Angeles (UCLA) (basketball and softball) – In the mid-1990s, Arizona and UCLA, as the two strongest basketball teams in the Pac-10, often clashed for dominance in the conference and for the conference championship. As in softball in the 1990s the two teams combined for nine of the ten championships awarded. And both combine for 19 national championships of 34 contended. Since 2024, Arizona is in the Big 12 and UCLA in the Big Ten.
- Stanford University and University of Southern California (USC) – two of the major private universities in California and the only two private schools in the Pac-12 before the conference's collapse, these two schools are highly competitive in most sports. Recent football upsets of the long successful Trojans (24–23 Stanford in 2007, the biggest point-spread upset in NCAA football history and an end to USC's 6-year home winning streak and 55–21 in 2009, the most points ever scored against the Trojans in the Los Angeles Memorial Coliseum) have led to a rekindling of the long-standing rivalry. However, the schools were separated in 2024, with Stanford in the ACC and USC in the Big Ten.

Additional non-conference rivalries involving Pac-12 schools (the most famous of which is arguably Notre Dame–USC) can be found in other sections of this article.

=== SEC rivalries ===
Home of the biggest football teams, the Southeastern Conference, (SEC), naturally includes the biggest rivalries which can be vital in deciding playoff position and even national championships. These include:

- University of Alabama and Auburn University – the "Iron Bowl", formerly played in Birmingham, Alabama, but now played alternately in Auburn and Tuscaloosa.
- University of Alabama and University of Tennessee – The "Third Saturday in October" game. An already heated rivalry hit fever pitch after Alabama went on NCAA probation in the early 2000s for recruiting violations reported by Tennessee coach Phillip Fulmer.
- University of Arkansas and Louisiana State University – "The Battle for the Golden Boot" game. The winner of this game receives a golden trophy of the states of Louisiana and Arkansas.
- University of Arkansas and University of Mississippi ("Ole Miss") – rivalry that is sometimes referred to as the Nutt Bowl (after Houston Nutt, who left the head coaching job at Arkansas after the 2007 season to take the same position at Ole Miss). See Arkansas–Ole Miss football rivalry.
- University of Arkansas and University of Missouri – called the Battle Line Rivalry. This rivalry was initiated at the annual meeting in 2014.
- University of Arkansas and Texas A&M University – the "Arkansas–Texas A&M football rivalry" started when both were members of the Southwestern Conference together. It once again became a conference rivalry in 2012 when the two schools were reunited in the SEC.
- Auburn University and University of Georgia – the "Deep South's Oldest Rivalry"
- Auburn University and Louisiana State University (LSU) – A budding SEC Western Division rivalry. Typically known for its unpredictable outcomes and eccentric storylines from surrounding events.
- Auburn University and University of Florida – historically one of the Southeastern Conference's longest rivalries. See more Auburn–Florida football rivalry.
- University of Florida and University of Georgia – The Florida vs. Georgia Football Classic, unofficially called "The World's Largest Outdoor Cocktail Party", at the (nominally) neutral site of Jacksonville, Florida.
- University of Florida and University of Tennessee – A rivalry that saw its heyday in the 1990s, when the Southeastern Conference realigned and played these schools against each other every year.
- University of Kentucky and University of South Carolina – while these two SEC schools have significant rivalries in other sports, this matchup is most significant in men's soccer, as these are the only two SEC members that field varsity soccer teams for men. The teams have been conference rivals since 2005—first in Conference USA, and starting with the 2022 season in the Sun Belt Conference. The men's soccer rivalry is known as the SEC Derby.
- Red River Showdown (University of Oklahoma vs. University of Texas at Austin) – college football's Red River Showdown. The two teams play annually at the Cotton Bowl in Dallas, with the fans of each side divided by the 50-yard line. The "Golden Hat" trophy is awarded to the winner. Both teams moved together to the SEC in 2024.
- University of Tennessee (UT) and University of Kentucky (UK) – a border war, UT has dominated UK over the last quarter century in football and UK in men's basketball. In addition to the important ball games, blood banks in the home cities of each university(Lexington, Kentucky and Knoxville, Tennessee) compete to see who can raise the most units of blood. This is known informally as the Blue-Orange Crush. The football game is traditionally known as "The Battle for the Beer Barrel," named for the orange and blue barrel that the winning team once received.
- Louisiana State University (LSU) and University of Mississippi ("Ole Miss") – Magnolia Bowl.
- University of Mississippi ("Ole Miss") and Mississippi State University – the "Egg Bowl"
- University of Tennessee and Vanderbilt University – Brigadier General Robert Neyland, the coach who brought a winning tradition to the University of Tennessee, was originally brought in to "beat Vandy", as Vanderbilt dominated the series in the early part of last century. In 2005, Vanderbilt beat the University of Tennessee for the first time in over two decades – one of the then-longest streaks in the NCAA.

=== Notre Dame rivalries ===
The University of Notre Dame (an independent in football) has numerous football rivals, the most notable of which include:

- Boston College – a game between the only two Catholic colleges that have Football Bowl Subdivision football programs. They compete for the Ireland Trophy. The rivalry has also been dubbed "The Holy War". This is one of several rivalries that have been revived on an intermittent basis following Notre Dame's 2013 entry into the Atlantic Coast Conference (ACC); while Notre Dame remains an independent in football, it has agreed to play five games per season against ACC schools, and to play all other ACC members at least once every three years. The first game under this new arrangement was won by Notre Dame at Fenway Park in 2015.
- Clemson University – the rivalry stems from being Atlantic Coast Conference (ACC) opponents, but plays has a larger role in football with their recent match-ups being close. The football rivalry has feature coaches such as Dabo Swinney, Brian Kelly, and Marcus Freeman.
- Michigan State University – a series that includes one of several "Games of the Century", the 1966 matchup that ended in a 10–10 tie. The teams play for the Megaphone Trophy. The game is played less often in the 2020s, due both to Notre Dame's new ACC commitments and the Big Ten increasing its conference schedule to nine games in 2016.
- Northwestern University – a rivalry that had its heyday in the 1920s and 1930s and even featured a Shillelagh trophy much like the ones that go to the winner of the Notre Dame–USC and Notre Dame–Purdue games. This rivalry game has been played infrequently in recent years.
- Purdue University – The Shillelagh Trophy. To be played less often in the future for the reasons mentioned in the Michigan State discussion.
- University of Miami – initially an easy win for the Irish, became a rivalry that was at its peak in the 1980s and often held national title implications. This is another rivalry that was revived following Notre Dame's arrival in the ACC; the first game under the new deal was in 2016, with the next matchup expected to be in 2025. See also: Catholics vs. Convicts.
- University of Michigan – a game between two of the winningest college football programs of all time. This rivalry went on hiatus after the 2014 season due to Notre Dame's ACC commitments.
- United States Military Academy (Army) – a rivalry held almost every year from an initial meeting in 1913 to the 1950s, in the era when the two were among the top schools in the nation, the two now play infrequently, with the most recent game occurring in 2024 at Yankee Stadium.
- United States Naval Academy (Navy) – a rivalry which Notre Dame has dominated. Navy won this game in 2007 for the first time since 1963, and again in 2009, 2010, and 2016, somewhat reversing the lopsided nature of the rivalry the previous four decades. It is one of the longer-running series in college football and is always hard-fought on both sides. Before Navy became a football-only member of what is now the American Conference in 2015, the two schools were the longest-standing independents in Division I FBS. The rivalry is officially scheduled through the 2032 season, and is expected to continue indefinitely.
- University of Pittsburgh – longtime rivals that shared Big East Conference affiliations (except in football) and ACC affiliations when both schools joined the ACC in 2013. Many of Notre Dame's most famed talents such as Joe Montana, Lou Holtz and Johnny Lujack hail from the Pittsburgh area. The "public vs. private" aspect as well as always having opposing team members that have played with or against each other since grade school has given the contest a unique distinction of dividing neighborhoods or even families during a fall Saturday. This rivalry is played once every three years as part of Notre Dame's agreement to play five ACC schools per season.
- University of Southern California – Playing for the Jeweled Shillelagh, it is a game between two of the three teams with the most Heisman Trophies. See also: Notre Dame–USC football rivalry
- Stanford University – nicknamed the Legends Trophy, this rivalry is a battle between legend-producing schools. Notre Dame created many legends while Stanford created legends like Jim Plunkett, John Elway, Toby Gerhart, and recently Andrew Luck. Also, during the 2020s conference realignment, Notre Dame strongly lobbied for Stanford to be invited to the ACC; the Cardinal was eventually accepted as a new ACC member effective in 2024.
- Georgia Tech – played on and off since the early mid-20th Century as a North vs. South rivalry of sorts. Following Notre Dame's arrival in the ACC, the rivalry resumed in 2015 on a three-year rotation, with the next meeting expected to be in 2027.

Additionally, Notre Dame men's basketball has traditional rivalries with DePaul University, Marquette University, and UCLA when each of the programs met regularly and were national contenders. Notre Dame women's basketball has developed a nationally significant rivalry with the University of Connecticut, with a published book focusing on one specific matchup.

== By region ==
=== Midwest rivalries ===
- Illinois
  - Bradley University and Illinois State University – College basketball's I-74 Rivalry
  - Loyola University Chicago and University of Illinois Chicago (UIC) – A Chicago rivalry that played out in the Horizon League for nearly 20 years, but became a nonconference matchup with Loyola's 2013 departure for the Missouri Valley Conference. Ironically, UIC joined the MVC in July 2022, the same time that Loyola moved to the Atlantic 10 Conference.
- Illinois and Missouri
  - University of Illinois and University of Missouri – College basketball's "Braggin' Rights" game, and football's Arch Rivalry.
- Indiana
  - Indiana State University and Ball State University – while this was an all-sports rivalry from 1919 through 1972, spanning the Indiana Intercollegiate Conference, Indiana Collegiate Conference and Midwestern Conference; it diminished when the Midwestern Conference dissolved and both schools joined rival conferences; the Missouri Valley Conference and the Mid-American Conference, respectively. Despite being in different conferences, the schools compete annually in most sports and periodically in football (Blue Key Victory Bell). Indiana State holds series leads in Men's Basketball (73–58), Baseball (90–51), Women's Basketball (22–9); they trail in football (24–38–1).
  - Ball State University and Purdue University Fort Wayne – Men's volleyball rivalry that plays out within the Midwestern Intercollegiate Volleyball Association. Prior to the 2018–19 school year, the second party to the rivalry was Indiana University – Purdue University Fort Wayne (IPFW); that school was dissolved in July 2018 and replaced by separate institutions affiliated with Indiana University and Purdue University. The IPFW athletic program was inherited by the Purdue-affiliated school. According to the college men's volleyball website Off the Block, which considers this the best rivalry in the sport, "There's respect along with mutual animosity" between players from the schools.
  - Butler University and Valparaiso University – while this was an all-sports rivalry in the Horizon League from Valparaiso's arrival in 2007 to Butler's departure in 2012, it has its roots in football, in which the two schools first played in 1927 and have played annually since 1951. Currently, they are conference rivals in the Pioneer Football League. The current rivalry trophy, the "Hoosier Helmet", was created prior to the 2006 season to commemorate the football rivalry.
  - DePauw University and Wabash College – college football's Monon Bell Classic
- Indiana and Ohio
  - Butler University and Xavier University – Longtime Midwestern private-school rivals, they are two of the three Midwestern schools that were invited by the "Catholic 7" to join the reconfigured Big East Conference in 2013.
- Iowa
  - Iowa State University and University of Iowa – this bitter intrastate rivalry is played out in nearly every sport for the Cy–Hawk Series trophy, an annual athletic competition involving all head-to-head regular season competitions between the two archrivals from the Big 12 and Big Ten Conferences. In football, the Cyclones and Hawkeyes compete annually for the Cy–Hawk Trophy.
  - Iowa State University, University of Iowa, University of Northern Iowa, and Drake University play in the state's mythical Big Four Series.
  - Drake University and University of Northern Iowa play for the DUNI Trophy. Members of the Missouri Valley Conference, they are rivals in almost all sports except football. While both operate FCS football programs, Drake plays in the non-scholarship Pioneer Football League and UNI in the scholarship-granting and highly competitive Missouri Valley Football Conference.
- Iowa and Nebraska
  - Drake University and Creighton University – former Missouri Valley Conference rivals play for the I-80 Trophy. The schools had been together in the MVC from 1928 until Creighton left in 1948, and again from Creighton's return in 1976 until 2013, when Creighton joined the new Big East.
- Michigan
  - Ferris State University and Grand Valley State University – the fierce rivalry of NCAA Division II sports in the Midwest; the Anchor-Bone Classic trophy is awarded to the winner of this historic battle.
  - Western Michigan University and Central Michigan University – winner receives the CMU–WMU Rivalry Trophy; often cited as one of the greatest rivalries in American collegiate football among the mid-majors.
  - Eastern Michigan University, Central Michigan University, and Western Michigan University – intrastate rivalry. Winner of head-to-head round-robin receives the Michigan MAC Trophy for football and men's basketball
  - Lake Superior State University and Northern Michigan University – (hockey) once two major hockey powerhouses, these two Upper Peninsula schools have no problem showing up at the other's home ice arena three hours away.
  - Calvin–Hope rivalry – Notable Division III basketball rivalry
  - Hope College and Kalamazoo College – the Wooden Shoe Rivalry
- Minnesota
  - University of Minnesota and Saint Cloud State University (hockey)
  - University of Minnesota and University of Minnesota Duluth (hockey)
  - University of Minnesota and Minnesota State University, Mankato (hockey)
  - University of Minnesota and University of St. Thomas (hockey)
  - University of St. Thomas and Minnesota State University, Mankato (hockey)
- Minnesota and North Dakota
  - University of Minnesota and the University of North Dakota (hockey)
- Missouri
  - Northwest Missouri State University and Truman State University – The Old Hickory Stick, which dates back to 1930 and was the oldest rivalry in NCAA Division II football. After the Mid–America Intercollegiate Athletics Association expanded to 15 schools, Northwest and Truman were not scheduled to play each other in 2012. The rivalry went on hiatus following that season, when Truman joined the Great Lakes Valley Conference.
- Missouri and Ohio
  - Saint Louis University and University of Dayton – These two similar Catholic schools play for the Arch–Baron Cup in men's basketball.
- Nebraska
  - Creighton University and University of Nebraska–Lincoln – Battle between schools that were long the only two Division I schools in the state of Nebraska. This rivalry is exacerbated by the fact that one is a private and Catholic school and the other is the primary public university in the state. Also, Omaha and Lincoln represent the two largest cities in Nebraska, separated by only roughly 50 miles (80 km). Primarily a basketball rivalry, although baseball has become a heated sport of contention within the last ten years.
  - University of Nebraska at Kearney and University of Nebraska Omaha (Omaha) – Mostly a football and wrestling rivalry. Both schools were almost always in the top five in Division II wrestling. The football teams played for the Nebraska Bell, a trophy that was introduced to the Football rivalry in 2002. Omaha has the series 25–8 over Kearney. However, the football rivalry ended after the 2010 season when Omaha dropped football, and the all-sports rivalry went dormant in 2011 when Omaha moved to Division I in all sports.
- The Dakotas
  - North Dakota State University and South Dakota State University – These two interstate rivals play for the Dakota Marker trophy in football, representing markers that were placed along the ND/SD border after they were split apart in 1889. The Dakota Marker rivalry was announced after both teams entered Division I sports in 2004, playing the first Dakota Marker Game. They played for the FCS national title in the 2022 season, with SDSU winning. While the Marker is only a football trophy contested within the Missouri Valley Football Conference, the rivalry exists in other sports, with both schools also being members of The Summit League.
  - University of North Dakota and North Dakota State University – These schools have played for the Nickel Trophy for football since 1894. They played for it until North Dakota State made the move to Division I FCS in 2004. North Dakota currently leads the series 62–46–3. The football rivalry resumed in 2015 with a game at NDSU in Fargo, and annual play resumed in 2019. The rivalry was rekindled in non-football sports in 2018 when UND and NDSU were reunited in the Summit League, and became a conference rivalry in football in 2020 when UND joined NDSU in the MVFC.
  - Black Hills State University and South Dakota School of Mines and Technology – the two schools located in the Black Hills region, one liberal arts, one engineering science, less than 50 miles (80 km) apart, are fierce rivals in all sports as members of the Rocky Mountain Athletic Conference. One of the oldest and most frequently played college football rivalries, the NCAA Division II schools play in the Black Hills Brawl. The winner of the game gets the Homestake Trophy, named after a gold mine in the Black Hills.
- Ohio
  - Central State University and Wilberforce University – a crosstown rivalry between NCAA Division II (Central State) and NAIA (Wilberforce) schools in the small community of Wilberforce. Both schools are among the few historically black schools outside the South. Central State, now a public school, began as a department within Wilberforce, then as now a private institution.
  - Kent State University and University of Akron – Battle for the Wagon Wheel
  - Miami University and University of Cincinnati – football rivalry for the Victory Bell; oldest west of the Allegheny Mountains, since 1888
  - Miami University and Ohio University – "Battle of the Bricks" all-sports rivalry
  - University of Cincinnati and Xavier University – two schools located 3 miles (4.8 km) apart from each other, one public, the other Catholic, makes for a vicious college basketball rivalry. The game has been historically known as the Crosstown Shootout. The 2011 game was marred by a bench-clearing brawl, which led to an official renaming of the rivalry game as the Crosstown Classic. After three years without significant incidents at the neutral U.S. Bank Arena in downtown Cincinnati, the rivalry returned to campus sites in 2015, and the "Crosstown Shootout" name returned.
  - University of Dayton and Xavier University – two Catholic schools in southwest Ohio battle in basketball for the Blackburn/McCafferty Trophy. The rivalry played out in the Atlantic 10 for nearly 20 years before Xavier's 2013 departure for the current Big East.
  - University of Toledo and Bowling Green State University – the "Battle of I-75"; winner gets the Peace Pipe
  - Wright State University and University of Dayton – also a crosstown public–Catholic rivalry. Dayton is located in the city proper, and Wright State is in the suburb of Fairborn but has a Dayton mailing address.
- Wisconsin
  - University of Wisconsin–Milwaukee (Milwaukee) and Marquette University – this rivalry is fought in most sports, but most intense is men's soccer, where they battle for the Milwaukee Cup.
  - University of Wisconsin–Madison and Marquette University – this rivalry is fought in most sports, but most intense is men's basketball, where the two schools meet annually, and have played each other over 125 times.

=== Northeastern rivalries ===
- New Jersey
  - Rutgers University and Seton Hall University, a rivalry played out solely between the two institutions' men's basketball teams. Long a conference rivalry in the original Big East, it continued even after the conference's 2013 split (with Rutgers moving to the Big Ten a year later). The two schools have agreed to continue the men's basketball series through the 2020–21 season.
  - Princeton University and Rutgers University, Despite their long-standing football rivalry dating back to the first intercollegiate football game in 1869, these two schools have not met on the gridiron since 1980. They continue to compete in every other sport. The two universities also continue this rivalry off the field in one of the longer running intercollegiate prank wars, the Rutgers–Princeton Cannon War.
- New York
  - Buffalo Big 4 Basketball – University at Buffalo, Canisius University, Niagara University, St. Bonaventure University
  - The New School university's art and design college, Parsons School of Design, and Fashion Institute of Technology; academic rivalry in the area of fashion, one that is contested annually in the Fusion Fashion Show.
  - Long Island University (LIU) and St. Francis College (St. Francis Brooklyn), primarily a basketball rivalry between two schools in Brooklyn less than a half-mile apart. The rivalry was also known as the Battle of Brooklyn. The two men's basketball teams first played in 1928, when LIU consisted solely of what is now that institution's Brooklyn campus. In 1975, by which time LIU had added what is now the Post campus in Nassau County, New York, the Brooklyn campus and St. Francis formalized their rivalry, holding an annual game. Both were members of the Northeast Conference from its formation in 1981 through 2023, after which St. Francis Brooklyn shut down its athletic program, and played two regular-season games each season in basketball, although only one of the two games was officially designated as a "Battle of Brooklyn" matchup. While the schools were rivals in all sports that both sponsored, the "Battle of Brooklyn" name was officially applied only to the men's basketball, women's basketball, and men's soccer rivalries. The women's basketball rivalry was brought under the "Battle of Brooklyn" umbrella in 1993–94, under the same conditions as the men's basketball rivalry; men's soccer officially became a "Battle of Brooklyn" in 2013–14. The rivalry took its final form in the 2019–20 school year, when LIU merged the athletic programs of its two main campuses—the NCAA Division I LIU Brooklyn Blackbirds and Division II LIU Post Pioneers—into a single Division I athletic program competing as the LIU Sharks. The men's rivalry remained a geographic "Battle of Brooklyn" in some sports (including basketball) but not in others, as some sports of the unified LIU program (including basketball) are based in Brooklyn and others (including soccer) at Post. St. Francis Brooklyn would drop sports after the 2023 spring semester.
  - Manhattan University and Fordham University; primarily a basketball rivalry between these two Catholic schools in The Bronx. Also known as the Battle of the Bronx. Its 100th basketball game was played on November 28, 2007.
  - Marist University and Siena University; many fans and sportswriters dubbed this match-up as "The Battle of I-87" because of the two-hour proximity of each school on Interstate 87 highway (coincidentally, the approximate distance between the two is 87.4 miles). It is said that no other two colleges in the Mid-Hudson Region have a hatred and distaste for one another than the Marist Red Foxes and Siena Saints. Although this rivalry exist in all sports, it is most heated during the basketball season. Whether it's held at McCann Field House or MVP Arena, both school's visiting fans come in droves, so eventfully conflicts are bound to happen on the court or in the stands. In 2009, the two school's club-level ice hockey teams established the 87 Challenge Cup, an annual three game round-robin challenge for a replica I-87 road sign; both of the team's logos and winning years are engraved on the back. Siena leads that series, 2–1.
  - Rensselaer Polytechnic Institute ("RPI") and Union College – (football and ice hockey) for the Dutchman's Shoes – the oldest college football rivalry in New York state
  - Rensselaer Polytechnic Institute and Clarkson University (ice hockey)
  - University of Rochester and Washington University in St. Louis – two of the top Division 3 basketball programs – UAA
  - St. Lawrence University and Clarkson University (ice hockey)
  - University at Albany and Binghamton University (most sports, especially basketball)
  - University at Albany (Albany) and Siena University (men's basketball) for the Albany Cup
  - University at Albany (Albany) and Stony Brook University – Like Albany–Binghamton, a New York public-school rivalry that mostly played out in the America East Conference until 2022, when Stony Brook joined the all-sports CAA. The two schools' football teams, which had played in separate conferences throughout their histories in that sport, became conference rivals in CAA Football in 2013.
  - SUNY Cortland and Ithaca College (football) for the Cortaca Jug
  - SUNY New Paltz and Marist University (woman's rugby). The two schools, separated by only the Mid-Hudson Bridge, were perennial finalists in the Metropolitan New York Rugby Union rugby playoffs.
  - SUNY New Paltz and Vassar College (men's rugby) contest the Hudson River Rivalry in the Tri-State Rugby Conference and formally the METNY Rugby Union. The schools also have a rivalry in men's volleyball, with both competing in the single-sport United Volleyball Conference.
  - St. John Fisher University and Nazareth University East Avenue rivals in Pittsford, New York
  - Syracuse University and Cornell University, primarily in lacrosse. The two schools are separated by an hour and faced off in the classic 2009 NCAA lacrosse championship game.
  - Rochester Institute of Technology and Canisius University (violent ice hockey history)
  - Oswego State and Plattsburgh State, primarily in ice hockey
- Pennsylvania
  - Philadelphia Big 5 – annual basketball series involving Philadelphia area teams. It historically involved La Salle University, the University of Pennsylvania (Penn), Saint Joseph's University, Temple University, and Villanova University; Drexel University, physically adjacent to Penn, was officially added effective in 2023–24. The rivalry continues to be known as the "Big 5", partially at Drexel's insistence. Although a "Big 5" women's basketball series had started in the 1979–80 season, women's basketball did not become an official part of the Big 5 until Drexel's addition.
    - Two of the three Catholic schools in the Big Five, Saint Joseph's and Villanova, have their own rivalry known as The Holy War.
    - The City 6 was the name applied to the combination of the Big 5 and Drexel before the latter became an official part of the Big 5. Drexel and Penn have their own rivalry, the Battle of 33rd Street. This is geographically the closest rivalry in NCAA Division I; the schools' basketball arenas are separated by about 0.3 miles/500 m.
  - University of Pittsburgh and Pennsylvania State University – a traditional football rivalry for both schools, the teams have not played each other since 2000. This football rivalry was renewed in 2016, with the teams playing a four-game series through 2019. The rivalry continues to exist in other sports and between alumni and fans.
  - University of Pittsburgh and Duquesne University play the annual City Game in college basketball.
  - University of Pittsburgh and Villanova University is an intraconference basketball rivalry that has existed since both schools were members of the Eastern 8.
  - Lehigh University and Lafayette College most played and longest uninterrupted rivalry in college football: as of 2024, 160 matchups, and played at least once every season since 1897. The 150th game in the rivalry was played at Yankee Stadium in 2014. See The Rivalry.
  - Indiana University of Pennsylvania and Slippery Rock University
  - Cheyney University and Lincoln University – the two oldest black colleges or HBCU in America. The schools compete in everything athletic or academic. Two teams compete annually in the heated thanksgiving weekend Basketball game. The reinstatement of Lincoln's football program added more fire to the rivalry.
  - Bloomsburg University and East Stroudsburg University – Division 2 football
  - Haverford College and Swarthmore College – winner of the most games against each other receives Hood Trophy.
  - Ursinus College and Franklin & Marshall College
  - Franklin & Marshall College and Dickinson College – the "Conestoga Wagon Cup" – the winner historically received a Conestoga Wagon that was passed between the two schools; however, in 2000 when Franklin & Marshall won the game, the Wagon was retired to the Franklin & Marshall College Alumni Sports and Fitness Center. The game is still played each year close to Homecoming.
  - Summit University and Keystone College – This rivalry is the biggest game for the two colleges due to closeness of location and the friendly relations of the schools makes the games in all sports so competitive. There is no football at these schools. They are a 20-minute drive separating campuses.
  - Summit University and Cairn University – These teams are the premier NCCAA teams in the nation fighting it out for top dog in Men's and Women's Soccer. There is no football at these schools. The games are wild and rough with all to play for. They are blood boiling games. The schools passionately dislike each other.
- New England
  - The Battle of Whitney Avenue– a college hockey series between ECAC Hockey members Quinnipiac and Yale. The schools met in the 2013 National championship game.
  - The Beanpot – a college ice hockey tournament involving four Boston-area schools and held at the city's main arena, TD Garden: Boston College, Boston University, Harvard University, Northeastern University
  - The Baseball Beanpot, an annual rivalry tournament which began in 1989. The participants are the same as in the hockey Beanpot, except that Boston University, which has no baseball program, is replaced by UMass.
  - Green Line Rivalry – Boston College vs. Boston University – One of the best known and fierce rivalries in NCAA Hockey, but also included football before BU terminated its football program in 1962 – Has been called the greatest rivalry in all of sports
  - Ivy League schools – see #Ivy League and service academy rivalries (above)
  - Amherst College and Williams College – known as "The Biggest Little Game In America"
  - Colby College, Bates College and Bowdoin College or Colby-Bates-Bowdoin – one of New England's oldest rivalries, dating to 1889, these three rivals originated after being baptized as "Little Ivies" situated in rural Maine.
  - Harvard and Yale – older than The Game by 23 years, the Harvard–Yale Regatta was the original source of the athletic rivalry between the two schools.
  - University of New Hampshire and University of Maine – the New Hampshire–Maine hockey rivalry is one of the most intense NCAA ice hockey rivalries and there is also a season ending football rivalry game between the two schools for the Brice–Cowell Musket.
  - UConn–UMass football rivalry, or the "U-Game"
  - Boston College–UMass football rivalry
  - Commonwealth Classic, Boston College-UMass Basketball Rivalry
  - Colonial Clash, UMass–UNH football rivalry. A rivalry whose future is in doubt with UMass' departure for the FBS.
  - Ocean State Rivalry - Providence Friars vs Rhode Island Rams
  - Ocean State Cup – awarded to each season's winner of the lacrosse series among the three Rhode Island Division I schools, the Brown Bears, Bryant Bulldogs, and Providence Friars
  - Merritt Parkway Melee – a rivalry between Quinnipiac University and Fairfield University, two schools in the Metro Atlantic Athletic Conference (MAAC) separated by about 30 miles on Connecticut's Merritt Parkway, the most intense matchups coming in women's volleyball where the two teams have met in the MAAC Championship in 2022 and 2023 with each side winning once
- Washington metropolitan area
  - George Mason University and George Washington University — The Revolutionary Rivalry, an effective crosstown rivalry created by conference realignment when Mason joined the A-10 in 2013. Mason is a public school with its main campus in central Fairfax County, Virginia, while GW is a private institution in the DC neighborhood of Foggy Bottom. Both are named after Founding Fathers whose homes were in modern-day Fairfax County.
- Interstate
  - Ivy League schools – see #Ivy League and service academy rivalries (above)
  - United States Military Academy (Army) and United States Naval Academy (Navy) – (football) in the Army–Navy Game (itself part of the Commander-in-Chief's Trophy competition with the United States Air Force Academy (Air Force))
  - University of Pittsburgh and West Virginia University – known as the Backyard Brawl. The football version of the rivalry ended for the time being after the 2011 season, with WVU moving to the Big 12 and Pitt announcing its future departure for the ACC. The men's basketball rivalry resumed in the 2017–18 season; the football rivalry resumed in 2022 and continues through 2025, and is also scheduled from 2029–2032.
  - Syracuse University and Georgetown University traditional basketball rivals, dating to pre-Big East. The rivalry temporarily ended in 2013 when Syracuse left the original Big East for the ACC and Georgetown broke away with the rest of the "Catholic 7" to form the current Big East. The schools resumed their men's basketball series in the 2015–16 season.
  - University of Pittsburgh vs Syracuse University is a longstanding annual eastern and intraconference rivalry in both football, played continuously since 1955, and basketball. This remains a conference rivalry in the ACC; their football matchup was one of several "protected" cross-divisional rivalries in that sport (i.e., guaranteed to be held annually) until the ACC eliminated its football divisions after the 2022 season. It remains a protected rivalry even after the ACC's 2024 expansion to California and Texas.
  - Penn State University vs. Syracuse University, resumed in 2013.
  - Penn State University and West Virginia University, a northeastern football rivalry that has been played infrequently since Penn State joined the Big Ten Conference.
  - Rutgers University and University of Connecticut – before Rutgers' 2014 move to the Big Ten, this was a growing rivalry in football and a heated rivalry in women's basketball between the two Big East/American Athletic Conference schools. Dormant since 2014.
  - University of Pittsburgh and University of Cincinnati – primarily active from 2005-2023.
  - Massachusetts Institute of Technology (MIT) and California Institute of Technology (Caltech), in pranks and academics.
  - Princeton University and Syracuse University – the two teams have clinched 14 NCAA men's lacrosse div. I champions in last two decades; two powerhouses ties NCAA div. I championship series, 2–2.
  - Syracuse University and Johns Hopkins University, a major NCAA men's lacrosse rivalry. The two schools combine for 20 national titles and have a heated rivalry against each other.
  - United States Coast Guard Academy (Coast Guard) and United States Merchant Marine Academy (Merchant Marine), a Division III service academy rivalry. While it is a non-conference rivalry in most sports, it is a conference matchup in football, with Merchant Marine as a single-sport member of Coast Guard's full-time home of the New England Women's and Men's Athletic Conference. The football teams compete for the Secretaries Cup. The 2020 edition of the Cup was notable as one of very few Division III football games played in calendar 2020, with most D-III schools choosing not to play football in 2020–21 due to COVID–19.

=== Southeastern rivalries ===
Universities in the Southeastern U.S., including those in the Atlantic Coast Conference (ACC), Conference USA (CUSA), Mid-Eastern Athletic Conference (MEAC), Southwestern Athletic Conference (SWAC), Southeastern Conference (SEC), Southern Conference (SoCon), Southland Conference, and Sun Belt Conference, have perhaps a complex number of rivalries, many associated with annual football games, and often with colorful nicknames:

- Alabama State University and Alabama A&M University – "The Magic City Classic", played annually in Birmingham. ASU also has a long-running rivalry with nearby Tuskegee University, "The Turkey Day Classic" played each Thanksgiving Day.
- Alcorn State University and Jackson State University – known as the Capital City Classic.
- Appalachian State University and Georgia Southern University – these two schools, with roots as teachers' colleges and similar enrollments, have an annual football rivalry that was one of the most intense at the FCS level, with the two combining for nine FCS national titles. From 1993 to 2013, this was an annual matchup in the SoCon; both schools joined FBS and the Sun Belt in 2014.
- Appalachian State University and Western Carolina University – An annual football game known as The Battle for the Old Mountain Jug, but became increasingly non-competitive from the mid-1980s on with the growth of the Appalachian football program. The rivalry ended when Appalachian left for FBS football and the Sun Belt in 2014.
- University of Arkansas and University of Texas at Austin – The rivalry with Texas is one of the biggest for Arkansas.
- Belmont University and Lipscomb University – two colleges in Nashville, Tennessee separated by 3 miles (5 km) of the same road; their basketball rivalry is known as the Battle of the Boulevard. The rivalry played out for many years in the NAIA, and later in the Atlantic Sun Conference (ASUN), but it became a non-conference matchup in 2012 when Belmont joined the Ohio Valley Conference (OVC). Belmont moved again in 2022 to the Missouri Valley Conference (MVC), Despite this, the men's and women's basketball teams still play two games each season, a rare feature among non-conference matchups.
- Belmont University and Tennessee State University – a Nashville rivalry created by conference realignment, with Belmont joining Tennessee State in the OVC. This became a non-conference matchup with Belmont's 2022 move to the MVC.
- Bethune–Cookman University and Florida A&M University – Florida's two most prominent historically black schools, longtime members of the Mid-Eastern Athletic Conference (MEAC) before moving together to the Southwestern Athletic Conference (SWAC) in 2021, compete annually in football in the Florida Classic.
- University of Central Florida (UCF) and University of South Florida – War on I-4. Became a non-conference rivalry in 2023, with UCF moving from the American Athletic Conference (now the American Conference) to the Big 12 Conference.
- University of North Carolina at Charlotte (Charlotte) and Davidson College, the only two Division I schools in North Carolina's most populous county, Mecklenburg County, before Queens University's 2022 move to Division I, compete each year in basketball for the Hornet's Nest Trophy.
- The Citadel and Virginia Military Institute (VMI) – (football) The Military Classic of the South "The Battle for the Silver Shako". The schools had been together in the Southern Conference from The Citadel's arrival in 1936 until VMI's departure in 2003. They were reunited when VMI rejoined the SoCon in 2014.
- Clemson University and University of Georgia – a rivalry between nearby schools that had national title implications in the early 1980s, but has been played less often since the SEC went to an eight-game conference schedule.
- Clemson University and University of South Carolina – this in-state rivalry, also known as The Palmetto Bowl has political and cultural origins and is one of the oldest rivalries in the South. See Carolina-Clemson rivalry and Clemson–South Carolina football brawl.
- University of the Cumberlands and Union Commonwealth University, formerly Union College – these NAIA schools, located in adjacent counties in eastern Kentucky, have a football rivalry that was first played in 1905, but was not an annual affair until 1985. The schools have played for the Brass Lantern, representing the region's coal mining legacy, since 1995, and have been rivals in Mid-South Conference football since 2002 (Cumberlands is a full member, and Union Commonwealth a football-only member).
- Duke University and University of Maryland – this is a recent rivalry, sparked because of Maryland's increased competitiveness in NCAA basketball. The two teams have long been competitive in basketball, and Maryland is known for its visceral hatred of Duke. However, Maryland's 2014 departure for the Big Ten ended the rivalry for the time being.
- East Carolina University and North Carolina State University – Two of the largest universities in the state of North Carolina. "The Battle for the Barrel" is a trophy which ECU currently holds as the victor of the most recent game in 2016.
- Elon University and University of North Carolina at Greensboro (UNC Greensboro) – A long-standing Southern Conference rivalry that was recently dubbed "The Faceoff on 40: The Fight and Fire Classic" due to the schools' proximity and situation along Interstate 40. The rivalry has been intermittent since Elon left the SoCon for the CAA in 2014.
- University of Florida and Florida State University – Heated rivalry between two college football powerhouses. The battles between Bobby Bowden and Steve Spurrier provided some of the rivalry's most memorable games. In the mid-1990s, this game almost always had national championship implications.
- University of Florida and University of Miami – formerly played for The Seminole War Canoe Trophy. With their win over the Hurricanes in 2008, the Gators are the current holders of the Florida Cup (See also: Florida–Miami football rivalry).
- University of Florida and University of Central Florida (UCF) – in recent years the two Florida school's have developed a growing in-state football rivalry with one another due in part UCF joining the "Power Four." The school's first match-up in 1999 and their most recent in 2024.
- Florida Atlantic University (FAU) and Florida International University (FIU) – A Miami-area rivalry that plays itself out annually in football's Shula Bowl and conference basketball games. It was a conference rivalry from 1993 to 1998 in the TAAC (now the ASUN); the two schools were reunited for football in 2005 and other sports in 2006 when FAU joined the Sun Belt. The two schools moved together to CUSA in 2013, but FAU joined what is now the American Conference in 2023. They remain conference rivals in men's soccer, as both schools joined the American for that sport in 2022, and FIU remains an American Conference affiliate.
- Furman University and Wofford College – the oldest football rivalry in South Carolina, involving SoCon members located in the two main cities of Upstate South Carolina (respectively Greenville and Spartanburg). In modern times, this has effectively become a crosstown rivalry, as the two cities are now at the core of the state's largest metropolitan area.
- George Mason University and James Madison University – Primarily a basketball rivalry between Virginia public schools. JMU has the all-time lead but Mason has won 22 out of the last 25 games. The two teams had once been rivals in the Colonial Athletic Association, but Mason moved to the Atlantic 10 Conference (A-10) in 2013, and JMU moved to the Sun Belt Conference in 2022.
- University of Georgia and Georgia Institute of Technology (Georgia Tech) – "Clean, Old-Fashioned Hate".
- Georgia Southern University and Georgia State University – An in-state rivalry, both schools lay claim to the initialism "GSU". Although the football rivalry is still relatively young, both schools have shared an intense rivalry in other sports, particularly men's basketball, since the 1970s. The rivalry further intensified in 2014 when Southern joined State in the Sun Belt Conference, and State hired the athletic director of Southern's rival Appalachian State for its vacancy in that position.
- Grambling State University and Southern University – the Bayou Classic in football is the most famous HBCU rivalry. For decades, it had been the only such matchup televised annually by one of the country's four major over-the-air television networks, but NBC has since moved the game from its main network to its cable/satellite NBCSN channel.
- Hampton University and Norfolk State University – an effective crosstown rivalry between HBCUs in the Hampton Roads area, and a study in contrasts—Hampton is a private institution on "The Peninsula", and Norfolk State is a public school on "The Southside". The football version is known as the Battle of the Bay.
- Henderson State University and Ouachita Baptist University – This Division II rivalry is not just a crosstown rivalry, but literally a neighborhood rivalry—the schools are located on opposite sides of an undivided highway in the small town of Arkadelphia, Arkansas. In 2019, Sports Illustrated called the football version of the rivalry, the Battle of the Ravine, "college football's most intimate rivalry".
- Jackson State University and Southern University – the Boombox Classic is the annual match-up between JSU and SU. The name is a reference to the two schools' marching bands – JSU's being the "Sonic Boom of the South" and SU's being "The Human Jukebox".
- Jackson State University and Tennessee State University – HBCU rivalry known as the Southern Heritage Classic.
- Johns Hopkins University and University of Maryland – The Rivalry Trophy (Lacrosse) The oldest rivalry in college lacrosse, and now a conference rivalry in both men's and women's lacrosse. Maryland joined the Big Ten for all sports and Hopkins for men's lacrosse only in 2014, and Hopkins joined Big Ten women's lacrosse in 2016.
- Johns Hopkins University and University of Virginia – Doyle Smith Cup (Lacrosse)
- University of Kentucky and University of Louisville – the "Governor's Cup" game in football, but even more significant as a basketball rivalry known as the "Battle for the Bluegrass". See Kentucky–Louisville rivalry.
- University of Kentucky and Duke University – Mostly a men's basketball rivalry, mainly created by an epic 1992 NCAA tournament game between the teams.
- University of Kentucky and Indiana University, locally significant in football and nationally important in men's basketball, sometimes referred to in football as the Bourbon Barrel Trophy. See Indiana–Kentucky rivalry. The basketball rivalry ended for the time being in 2012 when the two schools could not agree on the location for the games, though the teams have played in the NCAA tournament twice since the last regular-season game in 2011. The teams next played in 2025.
- University of Louisiana at Lafayette and Troy University – Men's tennis, "War at the Wasp Nest"
- University of Louisiana at Lafayette and University of Louisiana at Monroe – the "Battle on the Bayou"
- University of Louisville and University of Cincinnati – long-running rivalry known as the battle for The Keg of Nails. U of L's 2014 move to the ACC ended the rivalry for the time being.
- University of Louisville and University of Memphis – Longtime rivals in the Missouri Valley Conference, Metro Conference, and CUSA. The rivalry went largely dormant when U of L left for the Big East in 2005. While Memphis rejoined Louisville in the American Athletic Conference in 2013, U of L left for the ACC a year later.
- Louisiana State University (LSU) and Tulane University – the "Battle for the Rag"
- Louisiana Tech University and University of Southern Mississippi – Rivalry in Dixie.
- Loyola (MD) and Johns Hopkins University – lacrosse rivalry, also known as the Charles Street Rivalry. See Johns Hopkins–Loyola lacrosse rivalry.
- Marshall University and Ohio University – (football) the Battle for the Bell
- Marshall University and West Virginia University – also known as the Friends of Coal Bowl; due to the vast mining industry in the state of West Virginia.
- University of Maryland and United States Naval Academy (Navy) – A once heated in-state football rivalry that lapsed for 40 years after a controversial game in 1964 was finally revived in 2005 (See also: Crab Bowl Classic).
- University of Maryland and North Carolina State University – Hostility has increased in the football rivalry during recent years. Also, has a tradition of competitive basketball, including what has been called the greatest college basketball game ever played, the 1974 ACC championship game. Another rivalry that ended with Maryland's move to the Big Ten.
- University of Maryland and University of Maryland, Baltimore County (UMBC) – historically dominated by Maryland, this budding lacrosse rivalry was intensified in the 2007 NCAA men's lacrosse tournament when the Retrievers upset the Terrapins in College Park. It heated the following year when tournament committee chairman and Terrapins head coach Dave Cottle set up UMBC to travel far from their fanbase to avoid playing them in the tournament, sparking accusations in the lacrosse world of using politics to avoid a matchup.
- University of Maryland and West Virginia University – A long tradition of football rivalry, dating back to 1919 (See also: Maryland–West Virginia football rivalry).
- University of Memphis and University of Southern Mississippi – The Black and Blue Bowl. Went on hiatus after the 2012 season when Memphis joined the American.
- Middle Tennessee State University and Western Kentucky University (WKU) – These CUSA members, both regional universities separated by about 100 miles (160 km) of Interstate 65 and Interstate 24, have been rivals in most sports, especially football, in three different conferences. The football version of the rivalry is known as 100 Miles of Hate. Both schools were courted by the Mid-American Conference in the early-2020s realignment but remained in CUSA.
- Nicholls State University (Nicholls) and Northwestern State University – The NSU Challenge football game is a Louisiana and Southland Conference rivalry, with the winner receiving the NSU Trophy.
- Nicholls State University and Southeastern Louisiana University – The River Bell Classic football game is another Louisiana and Southland Conference rivalry, with the winner receiving the River Bell Trophy.
- University of North Carolina and Wake Forest University
- North Carolina A&T State University and North Carolina Central University – the North Carolina A&T–North Carolina Central rivalry was an annual, interdivisional HBCU rivalry until 2005.
- North Carolina A&T State University and Winston–Salem State University – the rivalry between the two Piedmont Triad HBCUs briefly escalated with WSSU's transition to Division I athletics and the Mid-Eastern Athletic Conference of which NC A&T is a member, but faded after WSSU backed out of its D-I transition and decided to stay in D-II.
- North Carolina State University and Wake Forest University – The oldest ACC basketball rivalry with over 225 played games.
- Northwestern State University and Stephen F. Austin State University – a heated rivalry that played out in the Southland Conference (SLC) from 1987, when both schools joined, through 2019, with the winner receiving the largest trophy in all of college football, Chief Caddo. The future of the rivalry was in flux for a time—in the 2020–21 school year, with football dramatically affected by COVID-19, NSU played in spring 2021 and SFA in fall 2020, and in July 2021, SFA left the SLC to join the Western Athletic Conference, later playing football in the United Athletic Conference. However, SFA rejoined the SLC in 2024.
- Old Dominion University and Virginia Commonwealth University (VCU) — The Old Dominion–VCU men's basketball rivalry between the two Virginia public institutions is said to be one of the best rivalries in basketball in the mid-majors. It was once an in-conference CAA rivalry, but became inter-conference after VCU's 2012 move to the A-10; ODU moved to CUSA in 2013 and rejoined the Sun Belt Conference in 2022.
- Rhodes College and Sewanee: The University of the South – The longest-running (continuously played) college football rivalry in the South, starting in 1899. Since 1954 the winner of this game has been awarded the Orgill Trophy.
- University of Richmond and Virginia Commonwealth University – a crosstown rivalry in Virginia's state capital that spans all sports except football, which Richmond plays and VCU does not. The basketball version has been known locally by several names, currently the Capital City Classic. Since 2012, when VCU joined Richmond in the A-10, it has been a conference rivalry.
- University of Richmond and The College of William & Mary – known as the "Oldest Rivalry in the South", this is the fourth oldest rivalry in college football, with the Tribe first battling the Spiders in 1890. The Tribe is up all-time, 59–52–5. It has been a conference rivalry for most of the current century; it became a non-conference rivalry in 2025 with Richmond moving football to the Patriot League, but the programs were reunited in 2026 when W&M became a football-only Patriot League member.
- University of Tennessee and University of Connecticut (UConn) – a nationally important rivalry in women's basketball (see UConn–Tennessee rivalry), though not regularly played since 2007, after then-Tennessee coach Pat Summitt accused UConn of recruiting irregularities. The rivalry was renewed in 2020, and the two schools played through the 2022–23 season.
- University of Tennessee at Chattanooga (Chattanooga) and Samford University – Southern Rail Rivalry.
- University of Virginia and Virginia Tech (see Virginia–Virginia Tech rivalry) – they play for the Commonwealth Cup in football
- Virginia Tech and Radford University – The rivalry is heated for every sport in which the two New River Valley schools compete, but in soccer one of the largest trophies in the nation is contested when they play annually for "The New River Rock".
- Virginia Tech and West Virginia University – played annually for the Black Diamond Trophy. Due to Virginia Tech's move to the ACC, and WVU's later move to the Big 12, this rivalry is now dormant.
- Washington College and Salisbury University – a storied Division III men's lacrosse rivalry, highlighted by the annual War on the Shore for the Charles B. Clark Cup, played alternately in Chestertown, Maryland, (home of Washington College) and Salisbury, Maryland. The 2006 War on the Shore was held at M&T Bank Stadium in Baltimore. The rivalry is also present to a lesser extent in all sports, as the two schools are the only Division III institutions on Maryland's Eastern Shore.
- Washington and Lee University and VMI play annually in the Lee–Jackson Lacrosse Classic.
- Washington and Lee University and Christopher Newport play annually for the Virginia LtN (Lacrosse the Nations) Cup.
- University of Puerto Rico, Río Piedras Campus and University of Puerto Rico at Mayagüez

Old Southeastern rivalries seldom played due to conference obligations, divisional changes etc.:

- Georgia Tech and Auburn
- Georgia Tech and Alabama
- Georgia Tech and Tennessee

=== Texas rivalries ===
These rivalries involve Texas schools that are not currently members of the Big 12 Conference. In two of these rivalries, both sides involved were members of the old Southwest Conference, four of whose schools were founding members of the Big 12. Another rivalry involves an old SWC team against an Oklahoma rival.

- Texas Southern University (TSU) and Prairie View A&M University (PV) – the two largest HBCUs in Texas square off in fierce athletic competitions every year. The football game is deemed the "Labor Day Classic", played annually in Houston. With the growth of Greater Houston to include Prairie View, this is now an effective crosstown rivalry.
- The University of Texas at Arlington (UTA) and University of North Texas (UNT) – The crosstown rivals are the two largest universities in the Dallas–Fort Worth Metroplex. The longest standing sport rivalry is in men's basketball which began in 1925 and was rekindled in 2015.
- The University of Texas at Arlington (UTA) and Texas State University – The in-state rivals are highly competitive against each other except in football, which UTA no longer plays, and normally draw higher than average attendance for several sports. From 2013 through 2022, this was a Sun Belt Conference rivalry, but it became a non-conference matchup in July 2022 when UTA moved to the Western Athletic Conference.
- Rice University and University of Houston – compete for the Bayou Bucket in both football and basketball, and in the Silver Glove series in baseball, as part of the Houston–Rice rivalry. Houston moved to the American Athletic Conference (The American) in 2013; both schools changed conferences in 2023, with Houston joining the Big 12 Conference and Rice joining The American. The rivalry has continued, at least for the time being.
- Rice University and University of Tulsa – Competed for the Williams Trophy. The rivalry went dormant when Tulsa joined The American in 2014, but is likely to resume on at least a semi-regular basis with Rice's 2023 arrival in that conference.
- Sam Houston State University and Stephen F. Austin State University – The football teams compete in the Battle of the Piney Woods. However, this rivalry became intermittent after the 2022 football season, with Sam Houston moving to FBS and Conference USA in 2023.
- Southern Methodist University (SMU) and Rice University – College football's Battle for the Mayor's Cup. The rivalry went dormant when SMU joined The American in 2013; while Rice joined SMU in that conference in 2023, SMU left for the ACC in 2024.
- Southern Methodist University (SMU) and Texas Christian University (TCU) – the Battle for the Iron Skillet. Although TCU moved to the Big 12 in 2012, and SMU joined The American in 2013 and the ACC in 2024, the football rivalry continues today. Further fuel was added to the rivalry when TCU hired away SMU head coach Sonny Dykes in the 2021–22 offseason, immediately followed by TCU's 2022 run to the national championship game.
- Stephen F. Austin State University and Northwestern State University – play for the largest trophy in college athletics; Chief Caddo, a large, 7.5 ft tall 320 lb (150 kg) wooden Indian statue.
- University of Texas at San Antonio (UTSA) and Texas State University – Compete in the I-35 rivalry. This was a conference rivalry in the 2012–13 school year, with both teams in the WAC, but the two schools separated after that season, with Texas State heading to the Sun Belt Conference and UTSA departing for Conference USA (and later joining The American in 2023).

=== Western rivalries ===
- Adams State University and Western Colorado University – The Adams State Grizzlies and the Western Colorado Mountaineers are fierce rivals at the NCAA Division II level. In the sport of football, the two schools meet every year to compete for the Colorado Classic Trophy.
- United States Air Force Academy (Air Force) and Colorado College – Men's ice hockey and women's soccer. Air Force, located just outside the city of Colorado Springs, and Colorado College, located within the city limits, are not rivals in most sports, since Air Force is a member of NCAA Division I and CC is a member of the non-scholarship Division III. However, CC is one of a small number of Division III schools with special permission from the NCAA to award scholarships in two sports as a Division I member, and therefore competes alongside Air Force on an even footing in those sports. In men's ice hockey, the two schools have a long-standing rivalry known as the Battle for Pikes Peak; in women's soccer, CC is a single-sport member in Air Force's home league, the Mountain West Conference (MW).
- University of Alaska Anchorage and University of Alaska Fairbanks – (ice hockey) for the Governor's Cup. This became a conference matchup in 2013 when the schools were united in the Western Collegiate Hockey Association (WCHA). The rivalry went on hiatus after the 2020–21 season when Anchorage dropped men's hockey, but resumed in 2022–23 with the return of Anchorage hockey.
- Boise State University and California State University, Fresno (Fresno State) – primarily a football rivalry, with the teams playing for the Milk Can. The Milk Can game had been a regular conference rivalry in the WAC and later in the MW. but it is no longer an annual matchup. When the MW expanded to 12 football members in 2013, the two teams were placed in separate divisions (with no protected cross-division games). The end of the MW's divisional split in 2023 did not reinstate the annual rivalry; they were not designated as annual opponents, meaning that future (conference) games would only be held once every three years. The two schools moved together to the reimagined Pac-12 Conference in 2026, and the annual football rivalry resumed at that time.
- Beehive Boot – A three-way football rivalry between BYU, Utah, and Utah State University.
- Boise State University and University of Idaho – an all-sports rivalry that lost some of its edge when Boise State left the WAC for the MW in 2011, and still more when Idaho returned to FCS football in 2018.
- Cal Poly Pomona and UC San Diego – The two most successful programs in the California Collegiate Athletic Association from 2000 to 2020, the period in which UCSD (now in the Division I Big West Conference) was a CCAA member. They were fierce rivals in all sports before UCSD's Division I move.
- California State University, Fullerton and California State University, Long Beach (Long Beach State); a baseball rivalry stemming from both programs' continual success.
- The College of Idaho and Northwest Nazarene University – a long-standing basketball rivalry, as well as an extensive history of student pranks.
- University of Colorado and Colorado State University – College football's Rocky Mountain Showdown
- Colorado State University and United States Air Force Academy for the Ram–Falcon Trophy
- University of Denver and Colorado College – (ice hockey) Battle for the Gold Pan Played between the superpowers of college hockey in the State of Colorado. Played since 1949. Widely considered to be the most heated and longstanding rivalry in college hockey, it is one of the sport's most played rivalries in the United States with over 300 games between the two school (of which nearly 30 games were in the playoffs, and 40 games required overtime). Both schools were charter members of the WCHA in 1951, and became charter members of the National Collegiate Hockey Conference in 2011, which started play in 2013.
- Gonzaga University and Eastern Washington University – a longtime men's basketball rivalry, but much less competitive since the rise of Gonzaga's program to national prominence in the 21st century. Gonzaga is in the city of Spokane, and EWU is in nearby Cheney.
- Gonzaga University and Saint Mary's College of California – Men's basketball rivalry that has become heated as Saint Mary's became the only consistent challenger to Gonzaga's WCC conference title streak in the late 2000s. However, Gonzaga transitioned from the rivalry, leaving the conference for the Pac-12 in 2026.
- Gonzaga University and University of Washington – an emerging, though intermittent, men's basketball rivalry. The winning school could claim bragging rights as best in the state. Has been on hold as neither program is willing to agree to restart the rivalry after Gonzaga's rise to prominence.
- Gonzaga University and Washington State University – also an emerging men's basketball rivalry. The two schools are about an hour apart by car. After the 2024 collapse of the Pac-12 left WSU as one of the conference's two remaining members, WSU placed most of its sports in Gonzaga's home of the West Coast Conference, and Gonzaga is one of the seven schools confirmed to be joining WSU and Oregon State in the reimagined Pac-12 in 2026.
- University of Hawaiʻi and California State University, Fresno (Fresno State) – All sports. Both were members of the WAC from 1992 to 2012, but have now separated, with Hawaiʻi leaving for the Big West and Fresno State to the MW. In football, however, it is still a conference rivalry, as Hawaiʻi football joined the MW alongside Fresno State. When MW football split into divisions in 2013, Fresno State and Hawaiʻi were placed in the same division, ensuring annual matchups through 2022, after which the MW eliminated its football divisions. The football teams now play once every three years (barring possible out-of-conference games). The schools were separated again in 2026 when Fresno State joined the Pac-12.
- University of Hawaiʻi and Brigham Young University – Football and volleyball. BYU has a significant following in Hawaiʻi—the school has a branch campus in Hawaiʻi, and the LDS Church also operates a temple near BYU's Hawaiʻi campus. The football version has been off-and-on since the MW broke away from the WAC in 1999, separating the two schools. In men's volleyball, it was long a conference rivalry in the Mountain Pacific Sports Federation before Hawaiʻi's primary home of the Big West Conference launched a men's volleyball league in the 2018 season (2017–18 school year); the two teams squared off for the national title in 2021.
- University of Idaho and The University of Montana, with the football teams playing for the Little Brown Stein. The rivalry between border-state schools, both current members of the Big Sky Conference, has its roots in football. The schools first played in football in 1903, and regularly played until Idaho moved to what is now Division I FBS in 1996. The all-sports rivalry lost some of its edge at that time, as Idaho also left the Big Sky, not returning until 2014. With Idaho reverting to FCS football and rejoining Big Sky football in 2018, the football rivalry has once again become an annual affair.
- University of Idaho and Washington State University – Known as the Battle of the Palouse. The two schools are located just 7 miles apart.
- University of Montana and Eastern Washington University – (all sports)
- University of Montana and Montana State University – Brawl of the Wild (football), Copper Cup (lacrosse)
- University of New Mexico and New Mexico State University – The Rio Grande Rivalry, involving all sports. Notably, the men's and women's basketball teams play home-and-away each season despite being in different conferences.
- Pomona–Pitzer Sagehens and Claremont-Mudd-Scripps Stags and Athenas – The two joint athletics teams of the Claremont Colleges consortium, involving all sports. Known as the Sixth Street Rivalry, referring to the street that separates the teams' athletics facilities.
- University of San Diego and San Diego State University – (basketball, baseball, and soccer) Cross-city rivals with an added public–private angle.
- University of San Francisco and Santa Clara University – San Francisco Bay Area Jesuit universities and also members of the West Coast Conference (WCC); primarily a basketball rivalry
- San José State University and California State University, Fresno (Fresno State) – very even rivalry in both football and basketball for over 70 years. For most of the rivalry's history, it has been a conference matchup, with the two schools playing in five different leagues – the CCAA, WCC (briefly), PCAA/Big West, WAC, and since 2013 the MW. When the MW eliminated its football divisions in 2023, the schools were designated as permanent opponents, guaranteeing annual games in that sport for the immediate future. However, the annual rivalry is likely to end in 2026 with Fresno State's Pac-12 move.
- San José State University and University of Hawaiʻi at Mānoa – Dick Tomey Legacy Game (football)
- San José State University and Stanford University – close proximity in the Silicon Valley leads to a natural rivalry.
- Santa Clara University and Saint Mary's College of California – formerly a football rivalry, now a basketball rivalry. Both schools are charter members of what is now the WCC, share a Catholic affiliation, and are in different portions of the Bay Area (Santa Clara in Silicon Valley, and Saint Mary's in the East Bay).
- Santa Clara University and San José State University – working man's university versus the local rich school; primarily a basketball rivalry.
- UC Davis and Cal Poly – in the Battle for the Golden Horseshoe (football) for the Golden Horseshoe Trophy
- UC Davis and Sacramento State – the two programs compete in all sports for the annual Causeway Cup, and specifically in the Causeway Classic (football) for the Causeway Carriage and Causeway Trophy. In most sports, it is a non-conference rivalry, with UC Davis in the non-football Big West (and set to join the Mountain West Conference in 2026) and Sacramento State in the football-sponsoring Big Sky (and set to join the Big West in 2026, with the football team's future affiliation uncertain. In two sports, football and men's soccer, it is a conference matchup—UC Davis is a football member of the Big Sky (and did not join MW football) and Sacramento State is a men's soccer member of the Big West (the Big Sky sponsors women's soccer but not men's).
- UC Irvine and California State University, Long Beach (Long Beach State) – Black and Blue Rivalry Series: The two Southern California schools compete in various sports such as baseball, basketball and volleyball to accumulate points for every victory. The school with the most points at the end of the year wins a surfboard.
- UC Santa Barbara and Cal Poly – Blue–Green Rivalry: Battle for the Central Coast with an emphasis on sustainability. The most intense has become the competition in men's soccer, where the matchup has featured 5 of the top 15 attended regular season soccer matches in NCAA history, all of which have happened since 2007. Women's volleyball, men's and women's basketball, and baseball also are heated matchups.
- University of Nevada, Las Vegas (UNLV) and University of Nevada – in the Battle for Nevada (football) for the Fremont Cannon. This became a conference rivalry in 2012 when Nevada joined UNLV in the MW. Both schools were also placed in the same division when the MW expanded to 12 football members, and were designated as permanent rivals when the MW eliminated its football divisions.
- University of Utah and Utah State University – (basketball and football, the Battle of the Brothers)
- University of Texas at El Paso (UTEP) and New Mexico State University – The Battle of I-10. Became a conference rivalry in 2023 when NMSU joined UTEP in Conference USA, but went non-conference again in 2026 when UTEP moved to the MW.
- University of Wyoming and Colorado State University – (football) the Border War for the Bronze Boot. Became a non-conference rivalry in 2026 when CSU joined the reimagined Pac-12.
- University of Wyoming and Utah State University (football) known as Bridger's Battle. Also becomes a non-conference rivalry in 2026 with Utah State's Pac-12 move.
- Utah State University and Brigham Young University (all sports) With the football rivalry playing for the Old Wagon Wheel
- Utah Valley University and Brigham Young University (all sports, particularly basketball). With both universities separated by less than four miles, this rivalry is known as the UCCU Crosstown Clash. Initially, BYU dominated the rivalry in the early 2000s and mid 2010s, winning their basketball matchups in blowouts. However, Utah Valley defeated BYU 114–101 in Provo in November 2016 giving them their first win over BYU in program history. After BYU added three more blowout victories in 2017, 2018, and 2020, UVU defeated #12 BYU at home on December 1, 2021, resulting in their first win over a ranked opponent in school history. A year later on December 7, 2022, UVU blew out BYU 75–60 in Provo, giving them the largest margin of victory in the history of the rivalry.
- Utah Tech University^{(formerly Dixie State)} and Utah Valley University – The "Old Hammer Rivalry" involves two schools with roots as junior colleges, which were rivals at that level from the early 1970s before separately becoming four-year institutions in the early 21st century, and also joining separate NCAA divisions (Dixie in D-II and UVU in D-I). An added angle is that long before Dixie adopted the Utah Tech name in 2022, Utah Valley was known informally as "Utah Tech" from 1963 to 1987. With Dixie joining UVU in D-I and the Western Athletic Conference in 2020, the schools renewed their rivalry. The two schools wer separated in 2026, with Tech joining the Big Sky Conference and Valley joining the Big West Conference.
- Western Washington University and Central Washington University – (football) Known as the Battle in Seattle – played at Lumen Field in Seattle for the Cascade Cup.

== Other ==
=== Historically Black Colleges and Universities ===
- Coppin State University and Morgan State University − separated by 5 miles, this traditional East vs. West Baltimore basketball is a traditional powerhouse HBCU and MEAC Rivalry Tabbed the "Battle of Baltimore".
- Cheyney University and Lincoln University – the two oldest black colleges, or HBCUs, in America, both located in Pennsylvania and also two of the few such schools outside the South. The schools compete in everything athletic or academic. Men's and women's teams compete annually in the heated thanksgiving weekend basketball games. The reinstatement of Lincoln's football program added more fire to the rivalry.
- Central State University and Wilberforce University – Like Cheyney and Lincoln, these are also rare examples of HBCUs outside the South. This is also a crosstown rivalry, with both schools located in the small community of Wilberforce, Ohio. In addition, Central State began as a department within Wilberforce University before becoming a separate institution and a public school.
- Hampton University and North Carolina A&T State University – Long a conference rivalry in the Mid-Eastern Athletic Conference (MEAC), it briefly became a non-conference matchup when Hampton left for the Big South Conference in 2018. The two schools were reunited when A&T joined the Big South in 2021, and both moved their non-football sports to the conference now known as the Coastal Athletic Association (CAA) the next year. Hampton football also joined the CAA's technically separate football arm of CAA Football in 2022; A&T joined CAA Football in 2023.
- North Carolina A&T State University and North Carolina Central University – the "Aggie–Eagle Classic" was an annual, interdivisional HBCU football until 2005.
- North Carolina A&T State University and Winston–Salem State University – the rivalry between the two Piedmont Triad HBCUs briefly escalated with WSSU's transition to Division I athletics and the MEAC, in which NC A&T was then a member, but faded when WSSU backed out of its D-I transition and decided to stay in Division II.
- Grambling State University and Southern University – the Bayou Classic in football is the most famous HBCU rivalry, and for most of the last four decades has been the only such matchup televised annually by one of the country's four major over-the-air television networks. (In the mid-2010s, NBC moved the game from its main network to its cable/satellite NBCSN network before shutting down the latter network after the 2021 season.)
- Bethune–Cookman University and Florida A&M University – the two schools, which moved together from their longtime home of the MEAC to the SWAC in 2021, compete annually in football in the Florida Classic.
- Norfolk State University and Hampton University – a now-dormant effective crosstown rivalry; both schools are located in the Hampton Roads metropolitan area on opposite sides of the eponymous harbor. The football version is called the Battle of the Bay. The rivalry was interrupted when Hampton left the MEAC for the Big South Conference in 2018, but resumed a year later.
- Virginia Union University and Virginia State University – another virtual crosstown rivalry, this one involving Division II schools in the CIAA. Virginia Union is a private university in the state capital of Richmond, while Virginia State is a public school in nearby Ettrick.
- Saint Augustine's University and Shaw University in Raleigh, North Carolina are HBCU rivalries in all sports.
- Florida A&M University and Southern University – Before FAMU joined Southern in the SWAC in 2021, their rivalry had been the oldest interconference rivalry in HBCU history, and still has a disputed claim as the oldest in HBCU history. Dates back to 1941 and was played consecutively for 55 yrs, which ended in 2001 because of a heated confrontation between Pete Richardson of Southern and Billy "Joe" Taylor of Florida A&M.
- Xavier University of Louisiana and Dillard University – crosstown rivalry between two NAIA schools in New Orleans. Both had been members of the Gulf South Athletic Conference (now the HBCU Athletic Conference) from the conference's 1981 formation until Xavier left in 2021 for the Red River Athletic Conference. The Crosstown Classic is still played twice each regular season in both men's and women's basketball, even with the schools in different conferences.

=== Religious schools ===
- Messiah University and Wheaton College (Illinois) – these Christian Schools compete frequently for the top Christian as well as Division III soccer team.
- Indiana Wesleyan University and Taylor University – the schools are separated by less than 15 minutes in rural NE Indiana, and have an intense rivalry in NAIA athletic events.
- Tabor College (Kansas) and Bethel College (Kansas) – These two Mennonite Schools which are only a few miles apart find a friendly rivalry that stems from a denominational split in the 1860s. Their soccer teams compete in the Menno–Cup and Football teams compete in the Menno–Bowl every year.
- Houghton University and Roberts Wesleyan University – these two former conference rivals, located within Western New York in the Genesee River Valley have a heated rivalry with the men's soccer game being the biggest draw for each school.
- Central Baptist College and Williams Baptist University – these two conference rivals are within the American Midwest Conference.
- Dordt University (Iowa) and Northwestern College (Iowa) – these Christian Schools are separated by only 12 miles in rural NW Iowa, and have an intense rivalry in NAIA athletic events.

== See also ==
- Sports rivalry
- List of NCAA college football rivalry games
- List of black college football classics
