= Boston College–UMass football rivalry =

American college football rivalry

- Boston College Eagles UMass Minutemen
- First meeting: November 28, 1901; Massachusetts, 11–0
- Latest meeting: September 11, 2021; Boston College, 45–28

Statistics
- Total meetings: 27
- All-time series: Boston College leads, 22–5
- Largest victory: Boston College, 70–8 (1974)
- Longest win streak: Boston College, 11 (1979–present)
- Current win streak: Boston College, 11

Locations of Boston College and UMass

The Boston College–UMass football rivalry is a college football rivalry between the Eagles of Boston College and Minutemen of the University of Massachusetts Amherst.

The rivalry was most active during the 1960s and 1970s, when the teams met on an annual basis. Because of changes to the NCAA's division structure, the teams did not meet for 30 years, but UMass' promotion to the top-tier NCAA Division I Football Bowl Subdivision enabled them to resume the rivalry, with a three-game series starting in 2014. The latest series has been dubbed The Battle of the Bay State. As of 2021, Boston College has won the past 11 meetings, including all of the 21st century matchups.

== Early history ==
The first game played between the two schools took place in Amherst, on November 28, 1901, with Massachusetts winning, 11–0. BC and Massachusetts met again 1902 and 1912, with Massachusetts winning all three contests before the series was halted. The two schools did not meet again on the football field until 1966, when BC and UMass—which by then had adopted its present name—began a 17-year series in which the teams would play each other in the last week of UMass' football season. Though both programs were in NCAA Division I, the highest level of competition at the time, they were facing an increasingly different level of opponents. BC, as an independent, played many of its games against large schools from outside New England. UMass was part of the Yankee Conference and played most of its games against regional rivals. Boston College dominated the stretch of the rivalry, winning 15 of the 17 games, routinely blowing out the overmatched Minutemen.

The NCAA split Division I into two subdivisions in 1978: the premier Division I-A (now known as the Football Bowl Subdivision) and the second-tier Division I-AA (now known as the Football Championship Subdivision). Boston College was placed in I-A; UMass, along with the rest of the Yankee Conference, in I-AA.

With BC's schedule increasingly filled with powerhouse I-A teams from outside New England, the annual rivalry entered a long hiatus after the 1982 game, and would not be played again for 30 years.

== Recent history ==
Starting in the 1990s, UMass administrators began talking about moving the football team to what was then still called Division I-A. Though the school trustees voted to hold off on an immediate move in 2003, the school did start to schedule games against Division I-A opponents—including trips to Chestnut Hill to play the Eagles.

In April 2011, UMass announced plans to join the Mid-American Conference and play the next year as the second Massachusetts member of the FBS. This prompted speculation that the two schools might renew their rivalry on a more regular basis. This was confirmed when it was reported in September 2011 that they had agreed to play a three-game biannual series beginning in 2014.

The first two games would be played in 2014 and 2016 at Gillette Stadium in Foxborough, a Boston suburb, about 30 miles south of Chestnut Hill. The games counted as UMass home dates, however, as the New England Patriots stadium had been UMass' regular home field in 2012 and 2013, and the team continued to play half its home schedule there for several years. A rematch in 2018 would be played at BC's Alumni Stadium.

For UMass, the games were a chance to test their mettle against the only other FBS team in the state and prove that they belong at the top level of NCAA football. For Boston College, the "rivalry" was not as keenly felt, as the Eagles have had four decades to establish a long history of competition with top-tier programs outside New England.

=== 2014 ===
The first-ever all-FBS BC-UMass game was both teams' season opener in September 2014. BC won the game by a score of 30–7.

The weeks preceding the game were met by a moderate amount of local media coverage and hype, mostly from the UMass side, which billed the game as the "Battle of the Bay State". One UMass fan even went as far as to outfit the Doug Flutie statue outside BC's Alumni Stadium with a Minuteman jersey. The famous 1980s BC quarterback tweeted: "Ew."

=== 2016 ===
The contest was again called the Battle of the Bay State. A UMass pep rally in the city of Boston was held the day before the game. BC defeated UMass 26–7.

== Game results ==
Rankings for BC from the Division I-A/FBS-level AP Poll. Rankings for UMass from Division I-AA/FCS-level Sports Network Poll 2011 or earlier, or AP Poll 2012 or later.

| Boston College victories | Massachusetts victories |

| No. | Date | Location | Winner | Score |
|---|---|---|---|---|
| 1 | November 28, 1901 | Boston | Massachusetts | 11–0 |
| 2 | October 4, 1902 | Amherst | Massachusetts | 30–0 |
| 3 | October 12, 1912 | Amherst | Massachusetts | 42–0 |
| 4 | November 19, 1966 | Hadley | Boston College | 14–7 |
| 5 | November 25, 1967 | Chestnut Hill | Boston College | 25–0 |
| 6 | November 23, 1968 | Hadley | Boston College | 21–6 |
| 7 | November 22, 1969 | Chestnut Hill | Boston College | 35–30 |
| 8 | November 21, 1970 | Hadley | Boston College | 21–10 |
| 9 | November 20, 1971 | Chestnut Hill | Boston College | 35–0 |
| 10 | November 25, 1972 | Hadley | Massachusetts | 28–7 |
| 11 | November 24, 1973 | Chestnut Hill | Boston College | 59–14 |
| 12 | November 23, 1974 | Hadley | Boston College | 70–8 |
| 13 | November 22, 1975 | Chestnut Hill | Boston College | 24–14 |
| 14 | November 20, 1976 | Hadley | Boston College | 35–0 |

| No. | Date | Location | Winner | Score |
|---|---|---|---|---|
| 15 | November 19, 1977 | Chestnut Hill | Boston College | 34–7 |
| 16 | November 25, 1978 | Hadley | Massachusetts | 27–0 |
| 17 | November 24, 1979 | Chestnut Hill | Boston College | 41–3 |
| 18 | November 22, 1980 | Hadley | Boston College | 13–12 |
| 19 | November 7, 1981 | Chestnut Hill | Boston College | 52–22 |
| 20 | November 6, 1982 | Hadley | Boston College | 34–21 |
| 21 | October 2, 2004 | Chestnut Hill | Boston College | 29–7 |
| 22 | September 29, 2007 | Chestnut Hill | #14 Boston College | 24–14 |
| 23 | September 24, 2011 | Chestnut Hill | Boston College | 45–17 |
| 24 | August 30, 2014 | Foxborough | Boston College | 30–7 |
| 25 | September 10, 2016 | Foxborough | Boston College | 26–7 |
| 26 | September 1, 2018 | Chestnut Hill | Boston College | 55–21 |
| 27 | September 11, 2021 | Hadley | Boston College | 45–28 |
Series: Boston College leads 22–5

== See also ==
- List of NCAA college football rivalry games
- Commonwealth Classic
