= Ocean State Rivalry =

College sports rivalry

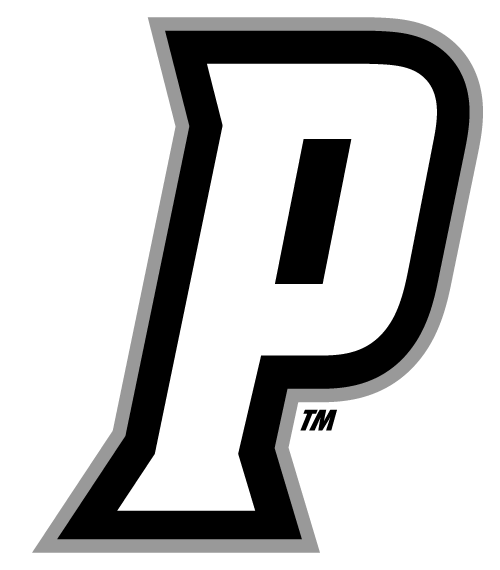
- Providence Friars Rhode Island Rams
- Sport: College basketball
- First meeting: 1920–21 season
- Latest meeting: December 6, 2025; Providence, 90–71
- Next meeting: TBD
- Stadiums: Amica Mutual Pavilion; Ryan Center

Statistics
- Total meetings: 135
- All-time series: Providence leads, 78–59
- Current win streak: Providence, 1 (2025–present)

The Ocean State Rivalry (also called the Battle for the Ocean State) is an American college basketball rivalry between the Providence Friars and Rhode Island Rams. The Ocean State Rivalry is thought to be one of the most competitive college basketball rivalries in the New England region. It is also a crucial game for the Ocean State Cup. The name of the rivalry comes from the nickname of the State of Rhode Island which is the Ocean State.

== History ==
The Providence Friars and the Rhode Island Rams have met 134 times since the 1933–34 college basketball season. The Ocean State Rivalry game is usually played in December, and the venue alternates between the Amica Mutual Pavilion in Downtown Providence in odd-numbered years and the Ryan Center on the campus of the University of Rhode Island in Kingston in even-numbered years. Providence leads the series 78–59.

Locations of Providence and Rhode Island along with the Amica Mutual Pavilion (Providence's home court)

== Game results ==
Providence victories	Rhode Island victories

No.	Date	Location	Winner	Score
1	December 8, 1920	Kingston, RI	Rhode Island	87–25
2	December 7, 1921	Kingston, RI	Rhode Island	35–19
3	December 6, 1955	Kingston, RI	Rhode Island	84–75
4	February 2, 1956	Providence, RI	Providence	82–80
5	January 4, 1957	Kingston, RI	Providence	70–56
6	February 12, 1957	Providence, RI	Rhode Island	73–70
7	December 5, 1957	Kingston, RI	Providence	55–45
8	February 11, 1958	Providence, RI	Providence	59–30
9	February 7, 1959	Providence, RI	Providence	71–59
10	February 26, 1959	Kingston, RI	Providence	65–60
11	February 16, 1960	Providence, RI	Providence	72–60
12	March 2, 1960	Kingston, RI	Providence	80–49
13	January 11, 1961	Kingston, RI	Providence	68–66
14	February 11, 1961	Providence, RI	Rhode Island	78–76
15	January 11, 1962	Providence, RI	Providence	68–65
16	February 13, 1962	Kingston, RI	Rhode Island	71–61
17	January 10, 1963	Kingston, RI	Providence	75–67
18	February 12, 1963	Providence, RI	Providence	93–75
19	February 1, 1964	Kingston, RI	Providence	83–76
20	February 13, 1964	Providence, RI	Providence	86–72
21	January 26, 1965	Kingston, RI	Providence	73–56
22	February 16, 1965	Providence, RI	Providence	88–72
23	January 11, 1966	Kingston, RI	Providence	86–79
24	February 17, 1966	Providence, RI	Rhode Island	84–61
25	December 13, 1966	Kingston, RI	Providence	56–52
26	February 23, 1967	Providence, RI	Providence	99–73
27	December 16, 1967	Providence, RI	Providence	80–63
28	February 12, 1968	Kingston, RI	Rhode Island	53–51
29	December 12, 1968	Kingston, RI	Providence	86–76
30	February 1, 1969	Providence, RI	Providence	83–59
31	January 31, 1970	Providence, RI	Rhode Island	93–85
32	February 25, 1970	Kingston, RI	Rhode Island	81–74
33	January 5, 1971	Providence, RI	Providence	98–92
34	February 17, 1971	Kingston, RI	Providence	81–64
35	February 5, 1972	Providence, RI	Providence	77–67
36	February 15, 1972	Kingston, RI	Rhode Island	75–73
37	January 4, 1973	Providence, RI	Providence	79–59
38	February 10, 1973	Providence, RI	Providence	102–81
39	January 26, 1974	Providence, RI	Providence	78–64
40	February 19, 1974	Providence, RI	Providence	76–73
41	February 11, 1975	Providence, RI	Providence	87–72
42	February 18, 1975	Providence, RI	Rhode Island	79–69
43	January 17, 1976	Providence, RI	Rhode Island	75–73
44	February 24, 1976	Providence, RI	Providence	85–66
45	January 18, 1977	Providence, RI	Providence	82–71
46	February 3, 1977	Providence, RI	Providence	67–66
47	January 17, 1978	Providence, RI	Providence	79–59
48	February 21, 1978	Providence, RI	Rhode Island	73–64
49	March 4, 1978	Providence, RI	Rhode Island	65–62
50	January 16, 1979	Providence, RI	Rhode Island	86–42

No.	Date	Location	Winner	Score
51	February 17, 1979	Providence, RI	Providence	84–77
52	January 16, 1980	Providence, RI	Providence	74–59
53	February 13, 1980	Providence, RI	Rhode Island	74–58
54	January 24, 1981	Providence, RI	Rhode Island	53–44
55	January 20, 1982	Providence, RI	Providence	49–47
56	February 8, 1983	Providence, RI	Providence	81–69
57	December 17, 1983	Providence, RI	Providence	69–58
58	December 8, 1984	Providence, RI	Providence	53–52
59	December 7, 1985	Providence, RI	Providence	78–71
60	December 6, 1986	Providence, RI	Providence	100–90
61	December 19, 1987	Providence, RI	Rhode Island	92–70
62	December 10, 1988	Providence, RI	Providence	76–70
63	December 9, 1989	Providence, RI	Rhode Island	78–77
64	December 8, 1990	Providence, RI	Providence	78–76
65	December 7, 1991	Providence, RI	Providence	77–74
66	December 8, 1992	Providence, RI	Rhode Island	81–79
67	January 11, 1994	Providence, RI	Providence	86–72
68	December 3, 1994	Providence, RI	Providence	80–77
69	December 9, 1995	Providence, RI	Providence	83–76
70	December 10, 1996	Providence, RI	Rhode Island	96–79
71	December 9, 1997	Providence, RI	Rhode Island	69–58
72	November 14, 1998	Providence, RI	Providence	87–63
73	December 7, 1999	Providence, RI	Providence	62–49
74	December 2, 2000	Providence, RI	Providence	95–72
75	December 1, 2001	Providence, RI	Providence	71–59
76	December 7, 2002	Providence, RI	Rhode Island	73–71
77	December 6, 2003	Kingston, RI	Rhode Island	89–79
78	December 4, 2004	Providence, RI	Providence	65–58
79	December 3, 2005	Kingston, RI	Rhode Island	77–69
80	December 2, 2006	Providence, RI	Providence	95–66
81	December 4, 2007	Kingston, RI	Rhode Island	77–60
82	December 6, 2008	Providence, RI	Providence	66–65
83	December 5, 2009	Kingston, RI	Rhode Island	86–82
84	December 4, 2010	Providence, RI	Providence	87–74
85	December 23, 2011	Kingston, RI	Providence	80–61
86	December 6, 2012	Providence, RI	Providence	72–57
87	December 6, 2013	Kingston, RI	Providence	50–49
88	December 10, 2014	Providence, RI	Providence	68–60
89	December 5, 2015	Kingston, RI	Providence	74–72
90	December 3, 2016	Providence, RI	Providence	63–60
91	December 2, 2017	Kingston, RI	Rhode Island	75–68
92	December 1, 2018	Providence, RI	Providence	59–50
93	December 6, 2019	Kingston, RI	Rhode Island	75–61
94	December 4, 2021	Providence, RI	Providence	66–52
95	December 3, 2022	Kingston, RI	Providence	88–74
96	December 2, 2023	Providence, RI	Providence	84–69
97	December 7, 2024	Kingston, RI	Rhode Island	69–63
98	December 6, 2025	Providence, RI	Providence	90–71
Series: Providence leads 67–31

== See also ==
- Ocean State Cup
