= Bird at the Buzzer =

2011 book by Jeff Goldberg

- Author: Jeff Goldberg; foreword by Doris Burke
- Language: English
- Genre: Sports
- Publisher: University of Nebraska Press
- Publication date: 2011
- Publication place: United States
- Media type: Print
- ISBN: 978-0-8032-2411-7
- Dewey Decimal: 796.323/630973 B 22
- LC Class: GV885.43.U44 G65 2011

Bird at the Buzzer is a 2011 sports book written by Jeff Goldberg (foreword by Doris Burke) about the 2001 Big East Championship women's basketball game between the University of Connecticut and Notre Dame, a pivotal game in the rivalry between the two teams.

== Background ==
At the time of publication, Connecticut and Notre Dame were two of the more successful college women's basketball programs. The UConn Huskies then had seven national championships, while the Notre Dame Fighting Irish had three Final Four appearances with a National Championship in 2001. Both teams played in the Big East Conference before its 2013 split, and appeared in the title game of the conference tournament multiple times, with UConn appearing 21 times between 1989 and 2011, and Notre Dame appearing five times in the same time period.

== Synopsis ==
The main subject of the book is the Big East tournament championship game of 2001, although the book intersperses play by play coverage of the game with background information on the entire season, as well as commentary on the players, coaches and other aspects of the two programs.

The game featured in the book was neither the first nor the last meeting of the two teams in the season. In January, UConn played Notre Dame at Notre Dame. The UConn team was undefeated, and ranked number one in the country at the start of the game. Notre Dame won 92–76, remained undefeated, and moved from third to the number one ranking at the next poll. Both teams would also meet in the semifinals of the NCAA Tournament, with Notre Dame prevailing and then going on to win the national championship. All of the meetings between the two teams that year were important games for each team, but the game in March had multiple story lines—a tournament championship at stake, a close game in which neither team led by more than eight points at any time, a devastating injury to one of the game's best players, and finally, a game that was decided by a single basket scored in the final moments, by one of the best players in the sport, Sue Bird.

== Authors ==
The author of the book is Jeff Goldberg, a sportswriter for the Hartford Courant covering the UConn women's team from 2001 to 2006, although on the night of the game featured in the book, he was acting as a freelance reporter for the Chicago Tribune. Goldberg covered the UConn basketball team as well as the Boston Red Sox. The foreword is by Doris Burke, an ESPN reporter.

== Players and Coaches ==
Many of the participants in the featured game, or in games leading up to the featured game, had notable careers at the time or went on to notable college and pro careers.

Sue Bird, Asjha Jones, Swin Cash, Diana Taurasi, Shea Ralph, Maria Conlon, Kelly Schumacher, Kennitra Johnson, and Tamika Williams played for the UConn team, under the coaching of Hall of Fame coach Geno Auriemma.

Ericka Haney, Kelley Siemon, Ruth Riley, Alicia Ratay, Niele Ivey, Le'Tania Severe, Jeneka Joyce, and Amanda Barksdale played for the Notre Dame team, under the coaching of the 2001 National Coach of the year Muffet McGraw.

Svetlana Abrosimova did not play in the featured game, as she sustained an injury in a win over Tennessee on February 1, 2001 that ended her college career. But she was the leading scorer in the prior match-up of the season, in which third-ranked Notre Dame defeated top-ranked Connecticut for the Huskies' first loss of the season.

Auriemma remains the UConn head coach to this day. McGraw continued at Notre Dame until her retirement after the 2019–20 season. McGraw went on to join Auriemma in both the Women's and Naismith Memorial Basketball Halls of Fame—the Women's Hall shortly after the 2011 season, and the Naismith Hall in 2017.

One player on each team went on to become a longtime member of her school's coaching staff. Ralph, who never played after graduating from UConn due to multiple knee injuries, was an assistant under Auriemma from 2008 until being hired in 2021 as head coach at Vanderbilt. Ivey became an assistant under McGraw in 2007, remaining on McGraw's staff until leaving in 2019 to take an assistant's position with the NBA's Memphis Grizzlies. After a season in the NBA, Ivey was named McGraw's successor as Irish head coach. UConn has won four additional national titles (2013–2016), and did not miss a Final Four after the book's publication until 2023. Notre Dame has made the Final Four six more times (2012–2015, 2018, 2019), and won a second national title in 2018.

== Reception ==
the best women's basketball game ever played

— Goldberg

Jeff Jacobs noted that the book was "well-written" with great metaphors, but the real core of the book was narrative. He wrote, "Women's basketball hasn't left enough permanent footprints in sports literature. From the moment he walked outside Gampel Pavilion, turned to former Courant sports writer Matt Eagan, the beat guy at the time, and said, ' I think we just saw the best women's basketball game ever played,' this was in the back of Goldberg's mind."

Jacobs noted the dual nature of the game—the positive, a well-played game important to both teams at the time, and the negative, the career-ending injury to Shea Ralph. He also noted Goldberg's regret—that the book was viewed as a book about UConn, although he wanted it viewed as "just as much a Notre Dame book".

Stephanie Summers, at Mansfield-Storrs Patch, referred to it as "The Game That Stands the Test of Time".

Kenneth Best, writing for UConn Today, noted the Notre Dame coverage, quoting Goldberg talking about Niele Ivey—"For Niele Ivey to look back and see a slice of that season, even though they lost the game, she thanked me for allowing her to relive that year. It was a special year for her."

Mel Greenberg, former veteran writer for The Philadelphia Inquirer, was initially skeptical of Goldberg's claim. Greenberg had planned to attend the game, but could not due to winter weather in the area. However, he read a copy of the book and concluded, "before even getting to the halfway point [I] decided that Goldberg's point is well taken". Greenberg also emphasized the point that the book was about two programs, not just one. He quoted Notre Dame point guard Skylar Diggins who remembered the game, but didn't want to read the book, and urged her to read it, pointing out that Goldberg went on to cover the first national title for Notre Dame less than a month later.

M.A. Voepel, columnist for ESPN, urged fans to take the time to read the book, even if you "know how the book ends". Voepel recounted his own watching of the game when it occurred, standing in a drafty hallway, covering the Big 12 Tournament, but more interested in the UConn–Notre Dame game. He followed up with Sue Bird, who found the book intriguing herself, as it reminded her of things that she hadn't remembered, such as helping Shea Ralph up when she was injured. It also gave her a chance to see the game through the eyes of the Notre Dame team.
