= Cumberlands–Union football rivalry =

American college football rivalry

Battle for the Brass Lantern
- Sport: College football
- Teams: Cumberlands Patriots; Union Bulldogs
- First meeting: 1905; Williamsburg Institute 37, Union 0
- Latest meeting: 2019; Cumberlands 98, Union 0
- Next meeting: 2020
- Trophy: The Brass Lantern (Originated in 1995)

Statistics
- Total meetings: 41
- All-time series: Cumberlands leads, 29–12
- Trophy series: Cumberlands leads, 17–8 since 1995
- Largest victory: Cumberlands 98–0 (2019)
- Longest win streak: Cumberlands, 5 (1987–1991, 2006–2010)
- Longest unbeaten streak: Cumberlands, 5 (1987–1991, 2006–2010)
- Current win streak: Cumberlands, 3 (2017–present)

Locations in Kentucky

The Brass Lantern is a traveling trophy for the winners in the Cumberlands–Union football rivalry. The award is presented in American college football rivalry games contested annually between the Cumberlands Patriots football team of the University of the Cumberlands and the Union Bulldogs football team of Union College. The schools are located less than 30 miles (48 km) apart in adjacent eastern Kentucky counties, with Cumberlands in Williamsburg and Union in Barbourville. Each annual contest is referred to as the Battle for the Brass Lantern, also locally referred to by some as "THE" game of the year.

The Patriots and the Bulldogs first met in 1905, making this rivalry one of the oldest in all of NAIA football. Since that initial meeting, the series has been discontinued and restarted at two different points in history. In the most recent renewal, the two teams have been meeting annually since 1985. Since 1987, the two teams have also been competing against each other and others as members of the Mid-South Conference and its predecessors.

Cumberlands leads the series 29–12 overall, including a 98–0 victory in the 2019 contest in Williamsburg.

== History of the trophy ==
The Brass Lantern was introduced as a traveling trophy for this rivalry in 1995 with the winner of the contest keeping the trophy until the following game. The lantern represents the coal mining industry, paying homage to a major industry in southeastern Kentucky where both colleges are located.

== Series statistics ==
Statistic	Cumberlands	Union
Games played	41	
Wins	29	12
Ties	0	
Known home wins	14	6
Known road wins	8	5
Known neutral site wins	2	0
Wins, location not known	5	1
Total points scored in the series	1,330	620
Most points scored in a game by one team	98 (2019)	49 (2016)
Most points scored in a game by both teams	98 (2019 – UC 98, UN 0)	
Fewest points scored in a game by both teams	7 (1990 – UC 7, UN 0)	
Fewest points scored in a game by one team in a win	7 (1989, 1990)	17 (1986)
Most points scored in a game by one team in a loss	45 (2016)	31 (1988)
Largest margin of victory	98 (2019)	27 (1905)
Smallest margin of victory	3 (1993, 1999, 2017)	1 (1995, 1996, 2005, 2014)
Longest winning streak	5 (1987–1991, 2006–2010)	2 (1985–1986, 1995–1996, 2000–2001)

== Notable games ==
1988 – Cumberland 36, Union 31 – The Bulldogs were looking to put a blemish on Cumberland's perfect record. The game went back and forth, but ultimately Cumberland prevailed 36–31 en route to a 10–0 regular-season record and the Mid-South Conference championship.

1995 – Union 22, Cumberland 21 – In the inaugural Brass Lantern Game, trailing 21–7 going into the fourth quarter, Union scored 15 fourth-quarter points to pull out the victory. Winston Pittman scored on a 1-yard run to make it a 21–13 game before Scott Russell scored on a 2-yard run to make it 21–19 with 6:41 to play. Then with 12 seconds remaining, Jeremy Macejewski connected on a 25-yard field goal to give Union the 22–21 victory.

1996 – Union 24, Cumberland 23 ^{OT} – The 1996 game went down to the wire and then some. Down 17–14 with 24 seconds to play, Jeremy Macejewski booted a 24-yard field goal to tie the game and send into overtime. In overtime, Scott Russell scored on a 25-yard run and Macejewski added the PAT to put Union up 24–17. On Cumberland's first play in overtime, Ahmad Broadnax scored on a 25-yard run, but Lance Gaudet's PAT attempt was no good, giving Union the 24–23 victory. Russell finished with 132 yards rushing on 19 carries.

2001 – Union 24, Cumberland 17 – The Bulldogs headed into the fourth quarter up 16–3 and appeared to be well on their way to victory. However, Cumberland scored early in the fourth to make it 16–10, and then with 1:23 to play, Cumberland scored on a Brandon Rogers 1-yard run to go up 17–10. Led by quarterback Bart Elam, Union used six plays to go 87 yards for the game-winning score. With 23 seconds left, Elam punched the ball in on a 2-yard run before tossing the two-point conversion pass to Ernie Samuel for the 24–17 victory. Elam passed for 266 yards and a touchdown on 16-of-31 passing and ran for 35 yards and two touchdowns. The win was also Tommy Reid's first as the Bulldogs' head coach.

2005 – Union 35, Cumberlands 34 – Cumberlands entered the game ranked No. 5 in the NAIA and appeared poised for its first postseason berth since 1988. After Union took an early 7–0 lead, Cumberlands reeled off 21 consecutive points for a 21–7 lead. Quarterback Joey Waters hit Courtney Elesby for a 3-yard touchdown pass to pull Union within 21–14 at the half, and then Waters hooked up with Jason Buster for an 11-yard scoring play to tie the game at 21 with 10:32 left in the third. After Cumberlands reclaimed a seven-point lead, Waters tossed two more touchdown passes and added a two-point conversion run to put Union up 35–28 with 7:23 to play in the game. Cumberlands cut the margin to 35–34 when Jeremy Vaught hauled in a 76-yard pass; at the 3:42 mark however, the PAT was no good as Union held on for the win. Waters completed 28-of-44 passes for 312 yards and four touchdowns as he was named the NAIA Offensive Player of the Week. Cumberlands went on to lose its next game in a blowout to Georgetown to finish the year 8–3 and out of the playoffs, while Union ended 4–6 overall and in a three-way tie for second in the Mid-South Conference East with Cumberlands and Pikeville as all three had a 3–2 league mark.

2006 – Cumberlands 21, Union 9 – The game itself was just the typical, run-of-the-mill Union-Cumberlands matchup with the teams going back and forth until a late fumble allowed Cumberlands to extend its five-point cushion to 21–9 en route to the 12-point win. What made this contest unique was that it was the first played on a neutral site and under lights as the game was held at Campbell Field in Corbin, Ky.

2008 – Cumberlands 35, Union 28 – For the first time in series history, both teams were ranked in the NAIA Top 20. With both teams undefeated in conference play, the victor would have an edge heading into the rest of the season in capturing the MSC East crown and a playoff berth. After Kyle Callahan hauled in a 21-yard touchdown pass with 6:57 to play in the game to pull Union even at 28–28, Freddy West capped a 64-yard drive with a 1-yard scoring plunge at the 5:38 mark to lift Cumberlands to the 35–28 decision.

2014 – Union 28, Cumberlands 27 – Playing the first night game at Union's Williamson Stadium, the Bulldogs held off the 11th-ranked Patriots for the one-point win. Down 21–20, LaVance Anderson broke loose for a 35-yard touchdown run with 3:05 remaining in the game. Union added the 2-point conversion to make it 28–21. Cumberlands counter and scored a touchdown with 1:18 left. The Patriots went for 2 and the win, but Doug Jeter sniffed out the play and tackled D.J. Rozier on the 5-yard line to seal the 28–27 Bulldog victory.

2016 – Union 49, Cumberlands 45 – In what was the highest scoring game in series history (94 combined points), Union overcame a 10-point, fourth-quarter deficit to pull out the four-point victory. Chandler Whittlesey connected with Kevin Eichelberger on a pair of touchdown passes of 18 and 15 yards in the fourth to lead the Bulldogs to victory.

2019 – Cumberlands 98, Union 0 – The Cumberlands win was one of the most lop-sided wins in NAIA history and the first in the history of the trophy era.

== Game results ==
Cumberlands victories	Union victories	Tie games

No.	Date	Location	Winner	Score
1	1905		Williamsburg Institute	37–0
2	1905		Williamsburg Institute	49–0
3	1905		Union	27–0
4	1922		Cumberlands	36–0
5	1923		Cumberlands	26–0
6	1924		Cumberlands	26–0
7	1985	Barbourville	Union	34–12
8	1986	Williamsburg	Union	17–10
9	1987	Barbourville	Cumberlands	50–19
10	1988	Williamsburg	Cumberlands	36–31
11	1989	Barbourville	Cumberlands	7–3
12	1990	Williamsburg	Cumberlands	7–0
13	1991	Williamsburg	Cumberlands	21–14
14	1992	Williamsburg	Union	28–19
15	1993	Barbourville	Cumberlands	12–9
16	1994	Williamsburg	Cumberlands	21–14
17	1995	Barbourville	Union	22–21
18	1996	Williamsburg	Union	24–23^{OT}
19	1997	Barbourville	Cumberlands	35–21
20	1998	Williamsburg	Cumberlands	19–14
21	1999	Williamsburg	Cumberlands	29–26

No.	Date	Location	Winner	Score
22	2000	Williamsburg	Union	31–7
23	2001	Barbourville	Union	24–17
24	2002	Williamsburg	Cumberlands	30–20
25	2003	Barbourville	Cumberlands	25–11
26	2004	Williamsburg	Cumberlands	42–14
27	2005	Williamsburg	Union	35–34
28	2006	Corbin	Cumberlands	21–9
29	2007	Corbin	Cumberlands	24–19
30	2008	Barbourville	Cumberlands	35–28
31	2009	Williamsburg	Cumberlands	24–12
32	2010	Williamsburg	Cumberlands	35–21
33	2011	Barbourville	Union	24–19
34	2012	Barbourville	Cumberlands	48–14
35	2013	Williamsburg	Cumberlands	52–21
36	2014	Barbourville	Union	28–27
37	2015	Williamsburg	Cumberlands	42–29
38	2016	Barbourville	Union	49–45
39	2017	Williamsburg	Cumberlands	33–30
40	2018	Barbourville	Cumberlands	67–7
41	2019	Williamsburg	Cumberlands	98–0
Series: Cumberlands leads 29–12
