= Commonwealth Classic =

American college basketball rivalry

- Boston College Eagles UMass Minutemen
- Sport: Men's basketball
- First meeting: 1905
- Latest meeting: 2026

Statistics
- Total meetings: 49
- All-time series: Boston College 27–22

Locations of Boston College and UMass

The Commonwealth Classic, also known as Commonwealth Cup or Governor's Cup (for the trophy awarded to the victor of the game), is the title of a basketball rivalry between Boston College and the University of Massachusetts. The name refers to the Commonwealth of Massachusetts, the New England state in which both universities are located. The game has been played a total of 49 times, with BC leading the series 27–22.

== History ==
The first game between the two schools occurred December 8, 1905. Since then, UMass and BC have played each other irregularly over the course of their in-state rivalry. In 1995, the basketball rivalry was officially designated as the "Commonwealth Classic" by then-Massachusetts Governor William Weld and members of the Massachusetts General Court who were among the nearly 20,000 spectators to watch the game at the new FleetCenter (now the TD Garden). It was the first college basketball game played in the new arena. The first game holds the record for college basketball attendance in New England. The series had been held annually since 1995, until Boston College suspended the series in 2012.

== UMass dominance in the 1990s ==
The 1990s were the best decade of UMass Minutemen Basketball as the Minutemen went to the 1996 Final Four and went 6–0 in the decade against Boston College. Their longest winning streak ever against their cross-state rivals.

== BC dominance in the 2000s ==
After going 0–6 against UMass in the 90's, BC has bounced back and won the first seven games in the 2000s, going 7–0. This streak was snapped on December 12, 2007 when UMass edged BC 83–80.

== UMass dominance cut short in 2010s ==
The 2010 game, won by Boston College, was played at the TD Garden at a part of the Boston Tip-Off Classic.College Basketball at Boston TD Banknorth Garden | Tip off Classic After UMass routed Boston College 82–46 in 2011 in Chestnut Hill, BC ended the annual series in 2012. After a year hiatus, the rivalry was renewed in 2013 as a part of the Coaches vs. Cancer Boston Tip-Off. UMass won the 2013 game by a score 86–73 and the 2014 game by a score of 71–62.

== Rivalry renewed in 2020s ==
After more than a decade without a game, UMass and Boston College renewed their rivalry with a December 2025 neutral site game at the Basketball Hall of Fame Classic in Springfield, Massachusetts. In the first meeting since November 2014, UMass defeated Boston College 76–74.

== Results ==
Boston College victories	UMass victories

Date	Location	Winner	Score		Notes
Date	Location	Winner	BC	UM	Notes
December 8, 1905	Amherst, MA	UMass	15	20	
February 26, 1951	Curry Hicks Cage; Amherst, MA	Boston College	59	43	
December 10, 1951	Boston Garden; Boston, MA	Boston College	76	52	
December 19, 1955	Boston Garden; Boston, MA	UMass	73	91	
January 30, 1957	Curry Hicks Cage; Amherst, MA	Boston College	68	66	
January 28, 1958	Roberts Center; Chestnut Hill, MA	Boston College	71	67	
February 19, 1959	Curry Hicks Cage; Amherst, MA	UMass	65	68	
January 28, 1960	Roberts Center; Chestnut Hill, MA	Boston College	74	51	
December 12, 1963	Roberts Center; Chestnut Hill, MA	UMass	74	93	
February 2, 1965	Curry Hicks Cage; Amherst, MA	Boston College	109	97	
February 8, 1966	Roberts Center; Chestnut Hill, MA	Boston College	101	80	
December 3, 1966	Curry Hicks Cage; Amherst, MA	Boston College	86	63	
December 21, 1966	Boston Garden; Boston, MA	Boston College	75	67	Boston Garden Christmas Basketball Tournament
February 6, 1968	Roberts Center; Chestnut Hill, MA	Boston College	94	70	
February 5, 1969	Curry Hicks Cage; Amherst, MA	Boston College	78	67	
February 3, 1970	Roberts Center; Chestnut Hill, MA	Boston College	83	76	
February 9, 1971	Curry Hicks Cage; Amherst, MA	UMass	77	85	
February 9, 1972	Roberts Center; Chestnut Hill, MA	Boston College	75	74	
February 7, 1973	Springfield Civic Center; Springfield, MA	UMass	52	76	
February 6, 1974	Roberts Center; Chestnut Hill, MA	Boston College	78	74	Overtime
February 5, 1975	Curry Hicks Cage; Amherst, MA	UMass	71	80	
February 4, 1976	Roberts Center; Chestnut Hill, MA	UMass	70	77	
December 12, 1976	Boston Garden; Boston, MA	UMass	71	94	Colonial Classic Tournament
February 2, 1977	Curry Hicks Cage; Amherst, MA	UMass	69	85	
January 27, 1978	Boston Garden; Boston, MA	UMass	64	88	Colonial Classic Tournament
January 26, 1979	Boston Garden; Boston, MA	Boston College	82	70	Colonial Classic Tournament
December 29, 1990	Springfield Civic Center; Springfield, MA	UMass	81	83	Abdow's Classic
December 9, 1995	FleetCenter; Boston, MA	#3 UMass	57	65	
January 18, 1997	FleetCenter; Boston, MA	UMass	78	90	
December 14, 1997	FleetCenter; Boston, MA	UMass	57	65	
December 12, 1998	Centrum Centre; Worcester, MA	UMass	45	75	
December 4, 1999	Conte Forum; Chestnut Hill, MA	UMass	67	74	
December 23, 1999	Bayamon, PR	Boston College	83	59	Puerto Rico Holiday Classic
December 17, 2000	Mullins Center; Amherst, MA	Boston College	74	65	
December 8, 2001	Conte Forum; Chestnut Hill, MA	#13 Boston College	80	78	
December 7, 2002	Mullins Center; Amherst, MA	Boston College	80	62	
December 6, 2003	Conte Forum; Chestnut Hill, MA	Boston College	76	75	
January 2, 2005	Mullins Center; Amherst, MA	Boston College	67	48	
January 3, 2006	Conte Forum; Chestnut Hill, MA	#11 Boston College	91	62	
December 2, 2006	Mullins Center; Amherst, MA	Boston College	84	73	
December 12, 2007	Conte Forum; Chestnut Hill, MA	UMass	80	83	
December 6, 2008	Mullins Center; Amherst, MA	Boston College	85	81	
December 23, 2009	Conte Forum; Chestnut Hill, MA	Boston College	79	67	
December 4, 2010	TD Garden; Boston, MA	Boston College	76	71	
November 21, 2011	Conte Forum; Chestnut Hill, MA	UMass	46	82	
November 10, 2013	TD Garden; Boston, MA	UMass	73	86	Coaches vs. Cancer Tripleheader
November 16, 2014	TD Garden; Boston, MA	UMass	62	71	Coaches vs. Cancer Tripleheader
December 10, 2025	MassMutual Center; Springfield, MA	UMass	74	76	Basketball Hall of Fame Classic
November 6, 2026	TD Garden; Boston, MA	Boston College	71	55	Basketball Hall of Fame Series

== See also ==
- Boston College–UMass football rivalry
