= List of schools changing conference in the 2010–2014 NCAA conference realignment =

The years from 2010 to 2014 saw an increase in conference realignment in the NCAA. With over 120 schools moving programs to new conferences, it resulted in significant changes in the American collegiate athletic landscape.

Several Division I all-sport conferences experienced significant changes as a result of these realignments. The Big East Conference split into separate football-sponsoring and non-football conferences, while after seeing near-total replacement of their membership the Western Athletic Conference replaced football with men's soccer and dropped women's gymnastics. The Great West likewise dropped football, and later disbanded after being left with unsustainable membership (1 school). Men's ice hockey was also significantly affected. The Big Ten Conference announced that it would begin sponsoring that sport in the 2013–14 season, which resulted in a chain of conference moves that led to the formation of the new National Collegiate Hockey Conference and the demise of the Central Collegiate Hockey Association. Three other single-sport conferences disbanded—the Atlantic Soccer Conference (men's), the National Lacrosse Conference (women's), and the Pacific Coast Softball Conference. Two lacrosse-only conferences, the ECAC Lacrosse League (men's) and American Lacrosse Conference (women's), disbanded after the 2013–14 school year (2014 lacrosse season), with all but two of their members announcing moves to other leagues for the 2015 lacrosse season (the Air Force men and Johns Hopkins women became independents; both teams would join conferences within two years).

Fewer changes took place in Division II and Division III. However, the period is still notable for the creation or demise of several conferences.

In Division II, the Great American Conference was created in 2011 by former members of the Gulf South and Lone Star Conferences, both of which remained in operation. Another league, the Great Midwest Athletic Conference (G-MAC), was founded the same year by an alliance of established D-II members and schools moving from the NAIA; it began play in 2012. In June of that year, the football-playing members of the West Virginia Intercollegiate Athletic Conference announced that they would break away to form a new conference. This led to the demise of the WVIAC and creation of the Mountain East Conference, plus a significant expansion of the G-MAC.

In Division III, seven members of the Southern Collegiate Athletic Conference broke from that league after the 2011–12 season, joining with an eighth school to form the Southern Athletic Association. Also, the single-sport New England Football Conference lost eight of its 16 members when the Massachusetts State Collegiate Athletic Conference announced it would add football in the 2013 season. Another single-sport conference, the 43-member North East Collegiate Volleyball Association in men's volleyball, disbanded after the 2010–11 school year, following the NCAA's announcement that it would sponsor an official Division III championship for that sport beginning in 2011–12. The creation of the Division III men's volleyball championship also led to the formation of two Division III conferences dedicated to that sport, the United Volleyball Conference in 2010 and the Continental Volleyball Conference in 2011. The CVC would split into two leagues along geographic lines in 2014, with the league's eastern members retaining the conference name and its midwestern members forming the Midwest Collegiate Volleyball League.

Three sports that have a single NCAA championship for all divisions—rifle, women's gymnastics, and women's water polo—saw the formation of new conferences in 2013. In rifle, six schools (five in Division I and one in Division II) created the Patriot Rifle Conference. Four former WAC women's gymnastics members joined with a fifth school to form an alliance initially known as the Mountain Rim Gymnastics Championship; the alliance ultimately gained full NCAA recognition as the Mountain Rim Gymnastics Conference in the 2014–15 school year. Finally, in women's water polo, seven California schools (four in Division I, one full Division II member, and two transitioning from the NAIA to Division II) formed the Golden Coast Conference.

== Membership changes ==
=== Confirmed changes ===
The following schools announced changes in conferences during this period of 2010–2014. The year given is the academic year in which the change occurred, which for spring sports differs from the year in which competition began.

Division I Schools
School	Sport(s)	Former conference	New conference	Date move was announced	Expected year move takes effect
South Dakota Coyotes	Full membership	Great West	Summit League	April 15, 2010	2011
Colorado Buffaloes	Full membership	Big 12	Pac-12	June 10, 2010	2011
Boise State Broncos	Full membership	WAC	Mountain West	June 11, 2010	2011
Nebraska Cornhuskers	Full membership	Big 12	Big Ten	June 11, 2010	2011
Utah Utes	Full membership	Mountain West	Pac-12	June 17, 2010	2011
Creighton Bluejays	Women's rowing	Independent	WCC	August 16, 2010	2010
Fresno State Bulldogs	Full membership	WAC	Mountain West	August 18, 2010	2012
Nevada Wolf Pack	Full membership	WAC	Mountain West	August 18, 2010	2012
Seattle Redhawks	Women's golf	Independent	WCC	August 26, 2010	2010
BYU Cougars	Full membership (non-football)	Mountain West	WCC	August 31, 2010	2011
BYU Cougars	Football	Mountain West	Independent	August 31, 2010	2011
Cal Poly Mustangs	Football	Great West	Big Sky	September 7, 2010	2012
UC Davis Aggies	Football	Great West	Big Sky	September 7, 2010	2012
Kennesaw State Owls	Football	No football program	Unknown	September 15, 2010	2014
Penn State Nittany Lions	Men's ice hockey	ESCHL (Club)	Independent	September 17, 2010	2012
BYU Cougars	Men's and women's swimming and diving	Mountain West	MPSF	October 19, 2010	2012
North Dakota Fighting Sioux (Note: North Dakota adopted the nickname of Fighting Hawks in November 2015, after three years going without a nickname by state law. See North Dakota Fighting Sioux controversy for more details.)	Full membership	Great West	Big Sky	November 1, 2010	2012
Southern Utah Thunderbirds	Full membership	Summit League	Big Sky	November 1, 2010	2012
Southern Utah Thunderbirds	Football	Great West	Big Sky	November 1, 2010	2012
Idaho State Bengals	Softball	PCSC	Big Sky	November 1, 2010	2012
Northern Colorado Bears	Softball	PCSC	Big Sky	November 1, 2010	2012
Portland State Vikings	Softball	PCSC	Big Sky	November 1, 2010	2012
Sacramento State Hornets	Softball	PCSC	Big Sky	November 1, 2010	2012
Weber State Wildcats	Softball	PCSC	Big Sky	November 1, 2010	2012
South Dakota Coyotes	Football	Great West	MVFC	November 3, 2010	2012
UTSA Roadrunners	Full membership	Southland	WAC	November 10, 2010	2012
Texas State Bobcats	Full membership	Southland	WAC	November 10, 2010	2012
Denver Pioneers	Full membership (non-football)	Sun Belt	WAC	November 10, 2010	2012
Mercer Bears	Football	No football program	Pioneer	November 20, 2010	2013
Hawaiʻi (Rainbow) Warriors and Rainbow Wahine (Note: At the time of announcement, some Hawaiʻi men's teams were nicknamed Warriors and others Rainbow Warriors. In 2013, the university announced that all men's teams would adopt "Rainbow Warriors".)	Full membership (non-football)	WAC	Big West	December 10, 2010	2012
Hawaiʻi Warriors	Football	WAC	Mountain West	December 10, 2010	2012
Hawaiʻi Rainbow Wahine	Women's indoor track and field, women's swimming and diving	WAC	MPSF	December 10, 2010	2012
Hawaiʻi Rainbow Warriors	Men's swimming and diving	WAC	MPSF	December 10, 2010	2012
BYU Cougars	Softball	Mountain West	WAC	January 27, 2011	2012
Nebraska–Omaha Mavericks (Note: Upon Nebraska–Omaha's arrival in the Summit League in July 2012, the university rebranded its athletic program as the Omaha Mavericks, although the university name did not change.)	Full membership	MIAA (D-II)	Summit League	March 12, 2011	2012
Stetson Hatters	Football	No football program	Pioneer	March 14, 2011	2013
BYU Cougars	Men's and women's indoor track and field	Mountain West	MPSF	March 17, 2011	2012
Minnesota Golden Gophers	Men's ice hockey	WCHA	Big Ten	March 21, 2011	2013
Wisconsin Badgers	Men's ice hockey	WCHA	Big Ten	March 21, 2011	2013
Michigan Wolverines	Men's ice hockey	CCHA	Big Ten	March 21, 2011	2013
Michigan State Spartans	Men's ice hockey	CCHA	Big Ten	March 21, 2011	2013
Ohio State Buckeyes	Men's ice hockey	CCHA	Big Ten	March 21, 2011	2013
Penn State Nittany Lions	Men's ice hockey	Independent	Big Ten	March 21, 2011	2013
UMass Minutemen	Football	CAA	MAC	April 20, 2011	2012
Belmont Bruins	Full membership (non-football)	Atlantic Sun	OVC	May 13, 2011	2012
Sacramento State Hornets	Men's soccer	MPSF	Big West	May 24, 2011	2012
Seattle Redhawks	Full membership (non-football)	Independent	WAC	June 14, 2011	2012
Seattle Redhawks	Softball	PCSC	WAC	June 14, 2011	2012
Seattle Redhawks	Women's golf	WCC	WAC	June 14, 2011	2012
North Dakota Fighting Sioux	Women's swimming and diving	Great West	WAC	June 15, 2011	2012
Boise State Broncos	Women's gymnastics	WAC	Independent	July 1, 2011	2011
North Dakota Fighting Sioux	Men's ice hockey	WCHA	NCHC	July 13, 2011	2013
Miami RedHawks	Men's ice hockey	CCHA	NCHC	July 13, 2011	2013
Nebraska–Omaha Mavericks	Men's ice hockey	WCHA	NCHC	July 13, 2011	2013
Denver Pioneers	Men's ice hockey	WCHA	NCHC	July 13, 2011	2013
Minnesota-Duluth Bulldogs	Men's ice hockey	WCHA	NCHC	July 13, 2011	2013
Colorado College Tigers	Men's ice hockey	WCHA	NCHC	July 13, 2011	2013
UT Arlington Mavericks	Full membership (non-football)	Southland	WAC	July 14, 2011	2012
Northern Michigan Wildcats	Men's ice hockey	CCHA	WCHA	July 20, 2011	2013
Ferris State Bulldogs	Men's ice hockey	CCHA	WCHA	August 27, 2011	2013
Alaska Nanooks	Men's ice hockey	CCHA	WCHA	August 27, 2011	2013
Lake Superior State Lakers	Men's ice hockey	CCHA	WCHA	August 27, 2011	2013
Texas A&M Aggies	Full membership	Big 12	SEC	August 31, 2011	2012
Penn State Nittany Lions	Women's ice hockey	Club hockey program	CHA	September 6, 2011	2012
CSU Bakersfield Roadrunners	Men's and women's outdoor track & field, women's tennis	Independent	Great West	September 16, 2011	2011
Syracuse Orange	Full membership	Big East	ACC	September 18, 2011	2013
Pittsburgh Panthers	Full membership	Big East	ACC	September 18, 2011	2013
CSU Bakersfield Roadrunners	Baseball	Independent	WAC	September 19, 2011	2012
Dallas Baptist Patriots	Baseball	Independent	WAC	September 19, 2011	2012
Western Michigan Broncos	Men's ice hockey	CCHA	NCHC	September 22, 2011	2013
St. Cloud State Huskies	Men's ice hockey	WCHA	NCHC	September 22, 2011	2013
Bowling Green Falcons	Men's ice hockey	CCHA	WCHA	October 4, 2011	2013
Notre Dame Fighting Irish	Men's ice hockey	CCHA	Hockey East	October 5, 2011	2013
TCU Horned Frogs	Full membership	Mountain West	Big 12	October 10, 2011	2012
Oral Roberts Golden Eagles	Full membership (non-football)	Summit League	Southland	October 25, 2011	2012
West Virginia Mountaineers	Full membership	Big East	Big 12	October 28, 2011	2012
West Virginia Mountaineers	Women's rowing	Big East	Big 12 & C-USA	October 28, 2011	2012
Missouri Tigers	Full membership	Big 12	SEC	November 6, 2011	2012
Lindenwood Lady Lions	Women's ice hockey	Independent	CHA	November 11, 2011	2012
Houston Baptist Huskies	Full membership	Great West (non-football)	Southland	November 21, 2011	2013
UCF Knights	Full membership	Conference USA	American	December 7, 2011	2013
Houston Cougars	Full membership	Conference USA	American	December 7, 2011	2013
SMU Mustangs	Full membership	Conference USA	American	December 7, 2011	2013
Northern Kentucky Norse	Full membership (non-football)	GLVC (D-II)	Atlantic Sun	December 8, 2011	2012
San Diego State Aztecs	Women's water polo	MPSF	Big West	December 12, 2011	2012
BYU Cougars	Softball	WAC	PCSC	December 12, 2011	2012
Longwood Lancers	Full membership (non-football)	Independent	Big South	January 23, 2012	2012
Navy Midshipmen	Football	Independent	American	January 24, 2012	2015
Colorado Buffaloes	Women's lacrosse	No lacrosse program	MPSF	February 1, 2012	2013
Memphis Tigers	Full membership	Conference USA	American	February 8, 2012	2013
Temple Owls	Full membership (except football)	A-10	American	March 7, 2012	2013
Temple Owls	Football	MAC	Big East	March 7, 2012	2012
RIT Tigers	Women's ice hockey	ECAC West (D-III)	CHA	March 20, 2012	2012
Pacific Tigers	Full membership (non-football)	Big West	WCC	March 28, 2012	2013
West Virginia Mountaineers	Men's soccer	Big East	MAC	April 3, 2012	2012
West Virginia Mountaineers	Wrestling	Eastern Wrestling League	Big 12	April 9, 2012	2013
Georgia State Panthers	Full membership	CAA	Sun Belt	April 9, 2012	2013
Columbus State Cougars	Rifle	Independent	OVC	April 27, 2012	2012
Butler Bulldogs	Full membership (non-football)	Horizon League	Atlantic 10	May 2, 2012	2012
Texas State Bobcats	Full membership	WAC	Sun Belt	May 2, 2012	2013
Charlotte 49ers	Full membership	Atlantic 10	C-USA	May 4, 2012	2013
FIU Panthers	Full membership	Sun Belt	C-USA	May 4, 2012	2013
Louisiana Tech Bulldogs and Lady Techsters	Full membership	WAC	C-USA	May 4, 2012	2013
North Texas Mean Green	Full membership	Sun Belt	C-USA	May 4, 2012	2013
San Jose State Spartans	Full membership	WAC	Mountain West	May 4, 2012	2013
Utah State Aggies	Full membership	WAC	Mountain West	May 4, 2012	2013
UTSA Roadrunners	Full membership	WAC	C-USA	May 4, 2012	2013
VCU Rams	Full membership (non-football)	CAA	Atlantic 10	May 15, 2012	2012
Old Dominion Monarchs	Full membership	CAA	C-USA	May 17, 2012	2013
UT Arlington Mavericks	Full membership (non-football)	WAC	Sun Belt	May 24, 2012	2013
Boise State Broncos	Women's gymnastics	Independent	WAC	June 14, 2012	2012
Boston University Terriers	Full membership (non-football)	America East	Patriot League	June 15, 2012	2013
Boston University Terriers	Women's rowing	CAA	Patriot League	June 15, 2012	2013
UConn Huskies	Men's ice hockey	Atlantic Hockey	Hockey East	June 21, 2012	2014
Butler Bulldogs	Women's golf	Horizon League	MAAC	August 1, 2012	2012
Albany Great Danes	Football	NEC	CAA	August 7, 2012	2013
Stony Brook Seawolves	Football	Big South	CAA	August 7, 2012	2013
Adelphi Panthers	Men's soccer	Independent	NE-10 (D-II)	August 16, 2012	2013
Incarnate Word Cardinals	Full membership	LSC (D-II)	Southland	August 20, 2012	2013
Dallas Baptist Patriots	Baseball	WAC	MVC	August 20, 2012	2013
New Orleans Privateers	Full membership	Independent	Southland	August 23, 2012	2013
Abilene Christian Wildcats	Full membership	LSC (D-II)	Southland	August 25, 2012	2013
Loyola (MD) Greyhounds	Full membership (non-football)	MAAC	Patriot League	August 29, 2012	2013
Loyola (MD) Greyhounds	Men's lacrosse	ECAC Lacrosse	Patriot League	August 29, 2012	2013
Loyola (MD) Greyhounds	Women's lacrosse	Big East	Patriot League	August 29, 2012	2013
New Mexico Lobos	Men's soccer	MPSF	C-USA	September 4, 2012	2013
Old Dominion Monarchs and Lady Monarchs	Men's and women's golf, men's and women's tennis, women's rowing	CAA	C-USA	September 4, 2012	2012
Notre Dame Fighting Irish	Full membership (non-football)	Big East	ACC	September 12, 2012	2013
New Mexico State Aggies	Football	WAC	Independent	September 12, 2012	2013
BYU Cougars	Softball	PCSC	WCC	September 13, 2012	2013
Loyola Marymount Lions	Softball	PCSC	WCC	September 13, 2012	2013
Saint Mary's Gaels	Softball	PCSC	WCC	September 13, 2012	2013
San Diego Toreros	Softball	PCSC	WCC	September 13, 2012	2013
Santa Clara Broncos	Softball	PCSC	WCC	September 13, 2012	2013
Missouri Tigers	Wrestling	Big 12	MAC	September 19, 2012	2012
Northern Iowa Panthers	Wrestling	WWC	MAC	September 19, 2012	2012
Old Dominion Monarchs	Wrestling	CAA	MAC	September 19, 2012	2013
CSU Bakersfield Roadrunners	Full membership	Independent	WAC	October 9, 2012	2013
CSU Bakersfield Roadrunners	Men's and women's outdoor track & field, women's tennis	Great West	WAC	October 9, 2012	2013
CSU Bakersfield Roadrunners	Softball	PCSC	WAC	October 9, 2012	2013
Eastern Michigan Eagles	Women's rowing	Independent	CAA	October 9, 2012	2012
Utah Valley Wolverines	Full membership (non-wrestling)	Great West	WAC	October 9, 2012	2013
Utah Valley Wolverines	Softball	PCSC	WAC	October 9, 2012	2013
Utah Valley Wolverines	Men's soccer	No team	WAC	October 9, 2012	2014
Houston Cougars	Women's golf	No team	American	October 15, 2012	2013
Idaho Vandals	Football	WAC	Independent	October 19, 2012	2013
Idaho Vandals	Full membership (non-football)	WAC	Big Sky	October 19, 2012	2014
Maryland Terrapins	Full membership	ACC	Big Ten	November 19, 2012	2014
Rutgers Scarlet Knights	Full membership	Big East	Big Ten	November 20, 2012	2014
Rutgers Scarlet Knights	Wrestling	EIWA	Big Ten	November 20, 2012	2014
East Carolina Pirates	Football	C-USA	American	November 27, 2012	2014
Tulane Green Wave	Full membership	C-USA	American	November 27, 2012	2014
Denver Pioneers	Full membership (non-football; except gymnastics, hockey, men's and women's lacrosse, and skiing)	WAC	Summit League	November 27, 2012	2013
Denver Pioneers	Men's soccer, men's and women's swimming and diving	MPSF	Summit League	November 27, 2012	2013
Grand Canyon Antelopes	Full membership	PacWest (D-II)	WAC	November 27, 2012	2013
Louisville Cardinals	Full membership	Big East	ACC	November 28, 2012	2014
Florida Atlantic Owls	Full membership	Sun Belt	C-USA	November 29, 2012	2013
Middle Tennessee Blue Raiders	Full membership	Sun Belt	C-USA	November 29, 2012	2013
College of Charleston Cougars	Full membership	SoCon	CAA	November 30, 2012	2013
College of Charleston Cougars	Men's and women's swimming and diving	CCSA	CAA	November 30, 2012	2013
Chicago State Cougars	Full membership	Great West	WAC	December 5, 2012	2013
Chicago State Cougars	Men's and women's soccer	No teams	WAC	December 5, 2012	2014
Northern Colorado Bears	Baseball	Great West	WAC	December 12, 2012	2013
Quinnipiac Bobcats	Full membership	NEC	MAAC	December 14, 2012	2013
Monmouth Hawks	Full membership (non-football)	NEC	MAAC	December 14, 2012	2013
DePaul Blue Demons	Full membership (non-football)	Big East	New Big East	December 14, 2012	2013
Georgetown Hoyas	Full membership (non-football)	Big East	New Big East	December 14, 2012	2013
Marquette Golden Eagles	Full membership (non-football)	Big East	New Big East	December 14, 2012	2013
Providence Friars	Full membership (non-football)	Big East	New Big East	December 14, 2012	2013
Seton Hall Pirates	Full membership (non-football)	Big East	New Big East	December 14, 2012	2013
St. John's Red Storm	Full membership (non-football)	Big East	New Big East	December 14, 2012	2013
Villanova Wildcats	Full membership (non-football)	Big East	New Big East	December 14, 2012	2013
Texas–Pan American Broncs (Note: Now the UTRGV Vaqueros, following the July 1, 2015 merger of Texas–Pan American and Texas–Brownsville.)	Full membership	Great West	WAC (Note: UTRGV inherited the Texas–Pan American athletic program, and maintains UTPA's WAC membership.)	December 19, 2012	2013
Air Force Falcons	Men's soccer	MPSF	WAC	January 9, 2013	2013
CSU Bakersfield Roadrunners	Men's soccer	MPSF	WAC	January 9, 2013	2013
Houston Baptist Huskies	Men's soccer	MPSF	WAC	January 9, 2013	2013
San Jose State Spartans	Men's soccer	MPSF	WAC	January 9, 2013	2013
Seattle Redhawks	Men's soccer	MPSF	WAC	January 9, 2013	2013
UNLV Rebels	Men's soccer	MPSF	WAC	January 9, 2013	2013
Alabama–Huntsville Chargers	Men's ice hockey	Independent	WCHA	January 17, 2013	2013
Texas–Pan American Broncs	Women's soccer	No team	WAC	February 6, 2013	2014
Texas–Pan American Broncs	Men's soccer	No team	WAC	February 6, 2013	2015
UMKC Kangaroos (Note: UMKC rebranded its athletic program as the Kansas City Roos in 2019. The university name has not changed.)	Full membership	Summit League	WAC	February 7, 2013	2013
Furman Paladins	Men's lacrosse	No team	Atlantic Sun	February 11, 2013	2013
High Point Panthers	Men's lacrosse	Independent	Atlantic Sun	February 11, 2013	2013
Jacksonville Dolphins	Men's lacrosse	MAAC	Atlantic Sun	February 11, 2013	2013
Mercer Bears	Men's lacrosse	Independent	Atlantic Sun	February 11, 2013	2013
North Dakota (no nickname)	Baseball	Great West	WAC	February 11, 2013	2013
Richmond Spiders	Men's lacrosse	Club team	Atlantic Sun	February 11, 2013	2013
VMI Keydets	Men's lacrosse	MAAC	Atlantic Sun	February 11, 2013	2013
UMass Lowell River Hawks	Full membership (except men's ice hockey)	NE-10 (D-II)	America East	February 14, 2013	2013
Monmouth Hawks	Football	NEC	Independent	February 14, 2013	2013
Monmouth Hawks	Football	Independent	Big South	February 14, 2013	2014
Sacramento State Hornets	Women's rowing	WIRA	C-USA	March 6, 2013	2013
San Diego State Aztecs	Women's rowing	WIRA	C-USA	March 6, 2013	2013
Butler Bulldogs	Full membership	Atlantic 10	New Big East	March 20, 2013	2013
Butler Bulldogs	Women's golf	MAAC	New Big East	March 20, 2013	2013
Creighton Bluejays	Full membership	Missouri Valley	New Big East	March 20, 2013	2013
Xavier Musketeers	Full membership	Atlantic 10	New Big East	March 20, 2013	2013
George Mason Patriots	Full membership	CAA	Atlantic 10	March 25, 2013	2013
East Carolina Pirates	Full membership	C-USA	American	March 27, 2013	2014
Appalachian State Mountaineers	Full membership	SoCon	Sun Belt	March 27, 2013	2014
Georgia Southern Eagles	Full membership	SoCon	Sun Belt	March 27, 2013	2014
Idaho Vandals	Football	Independent	Sun Belt	March 27, 2013	2014
New Mexico State Aggies	Football	Independent	Sun Belt	March 27, 2013	2014
Boston University Terriers	Wrestling	CAA	Dropping wrestling	April 1, 2013	2014
Western Kentucky Hilltoppers and Lady Toppers	Full membership	Sun Belt	C-USA	April 1, 2013	2014
Tulsa Golden Hurricane	Full membership	C-USA	American	April 2, 2013	2014
Loyola (Chicago) Ramblers	Full membership	Horizon League	Missouri Valley	April 19, 2013	2013
Fairfield Stags	Field hockey	America East	MAAC	April 19, 2013	2015
Rider Broncs	Field hockey	NEC	MAAC	April 19, 2013	2013
Siena Saints	Field hockey	NEC	MAAC	April 19, 2013	2013
Binghamton Bearcats	Wrestling	CAA	EIWA	April 25, 2013	2013
Boston University Terriers	Wrestling	CAA	EIWA	April 25, 2013	2013
Drexel Dragons	Wrestling	CAA	EIWA	April 25, 2013	2013
Hofstra Pride	Wrestling	CAA	EIWA	April 25, 2013	2013
Cincinnati Bearcats	Women's lacrosse	Big East	New Big East	May 1, 2013	2013
UConn Huskies	Field hockey, women's lacrosse	Big East	New Big East	May 1, 2013	2013
Louisville Cardinals	Field hockey, women's lacrosse	Big East	New Big East	May 1, 2013	2013
Old Dominion Monarchs	Field hockey	CAA	New Big East	May 1, 2013	2013
Rutgers Scarlet Knights	Men's and women's lacrosse	Big East	New Big East	May 1, 2013	2013
Temple Owls	Field hockey, women's lacrosse	Atlantic 10	New Big East	May 1, 2013	2013
Oakland Golden Grizzlies	Full membership	Summit League	Horizon League	May 7, 2013	2013
Davidson Wildcats	Full membership	SoCon	Atlantic 10	May 8, 2013	2014
Davidson Wildcats	Field hockey	NorPac	Atlantic 10	May 8, 2013	2014
Davidson Wildcats	Men's and women's swimming and diving	CCSA	Atlantic 10	May 8, 2013	2014
Davidson Wildcats	Women's lacrosse	Big South	Atlantic 10	May 8, 2013	2014
George Mason Patriots	Wrestling	CAA	EWL	May 13, 2013	2013
Rider Broncs	Wrestling	CAA	EWL	May 13, 2013	2013
Air Force Falcons	Men's swimming and diving	MPSF	WAC	May 18, 2013	2013
CSU Bakersfield Roadrunners	Men's swimming and diving	MPSF	WAC	May 18, 2013	2013
North Dakota (no nickname)	Men's swimming and diving	MPSF	WAC	May 18, 2013	2013
Seattle Redhawks	Men's swimming and diving	MPSF	WAC	May 18, 2013	2013
UNLV Rebels	Men's swimming and diving	MPSF	WAC	May 18, 2013	2013
Wyoming Cowboys	Men's swimming and diving	MPSF	WAC	May 18, 2013	2013
Air Force Falcons	Rifle	Independent	PRC	May 22, 2013	2013
Alaska Nanooks	Rifle	Independent	PRC	May 22, 2013	2013
Nevada Wolf Pack	Rifle	Independent	PRC	May 22, 2013	2013
Ohio State Buckeyes	Rifle	Independent	PRC	May 22, 2013	2013
TCU Horned Frogs	Rifle	Independent	PRC	May 22, 2013	2013
UTEP Miners	Rifle	Independent	PRC	May 22, 2013	2013
Elon Phoenix	Full membership	SoCon	CAA	May 23, 2013	2014
Elon Phoenix	Women's lacrosse	Atlantic Sun	CAA	May 23, 2013	2014
VMI Keydets	Full membership	Big South	SoCon	May 30, 2013	2014
East Tennessee State Buccaneers	Full membership	Atlantic Sun	SoCon	May 30, 2013	2014
East Tennessee State Buccaneers	Football	No team	SoCon	May 30, 2013	2015
Georgia State Panthers	Men's soccer	CAA	Independent	May 30, 2013	2013
Mercer Bears	Full membership	Atlantic Sun	SoCon	May 30, 2013	2014
Mercer Bears	Football	Pioneer	SoCon	May 30, 2013	2014
Mercer Bears	Women's track and field	No team	SoCon	May 30, 2013	2014
Denver Pioneers	Men's Lacrosse	ECAC Lacrosse League	New Big East	May 30, 2013	2013
Azusa Pacific Cougars	Women's water polo	CWPA	Golden Coast	June 3, 2013	2013
California Baptist Lancers	Women's water polo	CWPA	Golden Coast	June 3, 2013	2013
Fresno Pacific Sunbirds	Women's water polo	CWPA	Golden Coast	June 3, 2013	2013
Johns Hopkins Blue Jays	Men's Lacrosse	Independent	Big Ten	June 3, 2013	2014
Loyola Marymount Lions	Women's water polo	WWPA	Golden Coast	June 3, 2013	2013
Maryland Terrapins	Men's & Women's Lacrosse	ACC	Big Ten	June 3, 2013	2014
Michigan Wolverines	Men's Lacrosse	ECAC Lacrosse League	Big Ten	June 3, 2013	2014
Michigan Wolverines	Women's Lacrosse	ALC	Big Ten	June 3, 2013	2014
Northwestern Wildcats	Women's Lacrosse	ALC	Big Ten	June 3, 2013	2014
Ohio State Buckeyes	Men's Lacrosse	ECAC Lacrosse League	Big Ten	June 3, 2013	2014
Ohio State Buckeyes	Women's Lacrosse	ALC	Big Ten	June 3, 2013	2014
Pacific Tigers	Women's water polo	Big West	Golden Coast	June 3, 2013	2013
Penn State Nittany Lions	Men's Lacrosse	CAA	Big Ten	June 3, 2013	2014
Penn State Nittany Lions	Women's Lacrosse	ALC	Big Ten	June 3, 2013	2014
Rutgers Scarlet Knights	Men's & Women's Lacrosse	New Big East	Big Ten	June 3, 2013	2014
San Diego State Aztecs	Women's water polo	Big West	Golden Coast	June 3, 2013	2013
Santa Clara Broncos	Women's water polo	WWPA	Golden Coast	June 3, 2013	2013
Bryant Bulldogs	Field hockey	NEC	MAAC	June 5, 2013	2013
Robert Morris Colonials	Field hockey	NEC	MAAC	June 5, 2013	2013
Sacred Heart Pioneers	Field hockey	NEC	MAAC	June 5, 2013	2013
Fairfield Stags	Men's lacrosse	ECAC Lacrosse	CAA	June 18, 2013	2014
Old Dominion Lady Monarchs	Women's lacrosse	CAA	Independent	June 29, 2013	2013
Old Dominion Lady Monarchs	Women's lacrosse	Independent	Atlantic Sun	June 29, 2013	2014
NJIT Highlanders	Full membership	Great West	Independent	none	2013
Hobart Statesmen	Men's lacrosse	ECAC Lacrosse	NEC	July 1, 2013	2013
Bellarmine Knights	Men's lacrosse	ECAC Lacrosse	Atlantic Sun (Note: Days after the end of the realignment period (January 9, 2014), the Atlantic Sun and Southern Conference announced a lacrosse alliance under which sponsorship of men's lacrosse would shift from the A-Sun to the SoCon after the 2014 lacrosse season. Accordingly, Bellarmine began SoCon men's lacrosse play in the 2015 season (2014–15 school year).)	July 8, 2013	2014
Saint Francis (PA) Red Flash	Field hockey	NEC	Atlantic 10	July 11, 2013	2013
Howard Lady Bison	Women's soccer	Independent	SWAC	September 9, 2013	2014
Kennesaw State Owls	Football	No team	Big South	September 9, 2013	2015
Boston College Eagles	Fencing	IFA	ACC	September 27, 2013	2014
Duke Blue Devils	Fencing	Independent	ACC	September 27, 2013	2014
North Carolina Tar Heels	Fencing	Independent	ACC	September 27, 2013	2014
Notre Dame Fighting Irish	Fencing	MFC	ACC	September 27, 2013	2014
Merrimack Warriors	Women's ice hockey	Club team	Hockey East	October 24, 2013	2015
Oral Roberts Golden Eagles	Full membership (non-football)	Southland	Summit League	December 5, 2013	2014
Boise State Broncos	Women's gymnastics	WAC	MRGC	December 23, 2013	2013
BYU Cougars	Women's gymnastics	Independent	MRGC	December 23, 2013	2013
Denver Pioneers	Women's gymnastics	WAC	MRGC	December 23, 2013	2013
Southern Utah Thunderbirds	Women's gymnastics	WAC	MRGC	December 23, 2013	2013
Utah State Aggies	Women's gymnastics	WAC	MRGC	December 23, 2013	2013

Division II Schools
School	Sport(s)	Former conference	New conference	Date move was announced	Expected year move takes effect
Arkansas Tech Wonder Boys and Golden Suns	Full membership	GSC	GAC	June 13, 2010	2011
Arkansas-Monticello Boll Weevils and Cotton Blossoms	Full membership	GSC	GAC	June 13, 2010	2011
East Central Tigers	Full Membership	LSC	GAC	June 13, 2010	2011
Harding Bisons	Full Membership	GSC	GAC	June 13, 2010	2011
Henderson State Reddies	Full Membership	GSC	GAC	June 13, 2010	2011
Ouachita Baptist Tigers	Full Membership	GSC	GAC	June 13, 2010	2011
Southeastern Oklahoma State Savage Storm	Full Membership	LSC	GAC	June 13, 2010	2011
Southern Arkansas Muleriders	Full Membership	GSC	GAC	June 13, 2010	2011
Southwestern Oklahoma Bulldogs	Full Membership	LSC	GAC	June 13, 2010	2011
Central Oklahoma Bronchos	Full Membership	LSC	MIAA	July 29, 2010	2012
Northeastern State (OK) RiverHawks	Full Membership	LSC	MIAA	July 29, 2010	2012
Lindenwood Lions	Full Membership	HAAC (NAIA)	MIAA	September 24, 2010	2012
Nebraska–Kearney Lopers	Full Membership	RMAC	MIAA	September 24, 2010	2012
Northwestern Oklahoma State Rangers	Full membership	SAC (NAIA)	GAC	May 11, 2011	2012
Southern Nazarene Crimson Storm	Full membership	SAC (NAIA)	GAC	May 11, 2011	2012
Pitt–Johnstown Mountain Lions	Full membership	WVIAC	PSAC	August 19, 2012	2013
Seton Hill Griffins	Full membership	WVIAC	PSAC	August 19, 2012	2013
Charleston (WV) Golden Eagles	Full membership	WVIAC	MEC	August 20, 2012	2013
Concord Mountain Lions	Full membership	WVIAC	MEC	August 20, 2012	2013
Fairmont State Falcons	Full membership	WVIAC	MEC	August 20, 2012	2013
Glenville State Pioneers	Full membership	WVIAC	MEC	August 20, 2012	2013
Notre Dame (OH) Falcons	Full membership	D-II independent	MEC	August 20, 2012	2013
Shepherd Rams	Full membership	WVIAC	MEC	August 20, 2012	2013
Urbana Blue Knights	Full membership	G-MAC/GLVC	MEC	August 20, 2012	2013
UVA–Wise Highland Cavaliers (Note: UVA–Wise dropped "Highland" from its athletic nickname in 2017.)	Full membership	Mid-South (NAIA); G-MAC (D- II)	MEC	August 20, 2012	2013
West Liberty Hilltoppers	Full membership	WVIAC	MEC	August 20, 2012	2013
West Virginia State Yellow Jackets	Full membership	WVIAC	MEC	August 20, 2012	2013
West Virginia Wesleyan Bobcats	Full membership	WVIAC	MEC	August 20, 2012	2013
Wheeling Jesuit Cardinals (Note: Known as Wheeling University since 2019; the athletic nickname remains Cardinals.)	Full membership (non-football)	WVIAC	MEC	August 20, 2012	2013
Alderson–Broaddus Battlers	Full membership	WVIAC	G-MAC	August 21, 2012	2013
Davis & Elkins Senators	Full membership	WVIAC	G-MAC	August 21, 2012	2013
Ohio Valley Fighting Scots	Full membership	WVIAC	G-MAC	August 21, 2012	2013
Salem International Tigers (Note: Known as Salem University since 2016; the athletic nickname remains "Tigers".)	Full membership	D-II independent	G-MAC	October 16, 2012	2013

=== Aborted changes ===
In addition to the above moves, several schools announced intended changes of conference, but then changed course without ever competing in the new conference, selecting a different conference instead or deciding not to move at all. While not actualized, some of these announced conference changes altered the dynamic of the broader realignment.

School	Sport(s)	Former conference	Original new conference	Date move was announced	Year of planned move	Date move was aborted	New destination conference
Rhode Island Rams	Football	CAA	NEC	November 22, 2010	2013	October 28, 2012	CAA
TCU Horned Frogs	Full membership	Mountain West	Big East	November 29, 2010	2012	October 10, 2011	Big 12
New Orleans Privateers	Full membership	Independent	GSC (D-II)	June 21, 2011	2012	March 9, 2012	Independent
Boise State Broncos	Football	Mountain West	Big East	December 7, 2011	2013	December 31, 2012	Mountain West
Boise State Broncos	Full membership (non-football)	Mountain West	WAC	December 7, 2011	2013	August 24, 2012	Big West
San Diego State Aztecs	Football	Mountain West	Big East	December 7, 2011	2013	January 16, 2013	Mountain West
San Diego State Aztecs	Full membership (non-football)	Mountain West	Big West	December 12, 2011	2013	January 16, 2013	Mountain West
San Diego State Aztecs	Men's soccer	Pac-12	Big West	December 12, 2011	2015	January 16, 2013	Pac-12
Boise State Broncos	Full membership (non-football)	Mountain West/WAC	Big West	August 24, 2012	2013	December 31, 2012	Mountain West
Old Dominion Monarchs	Field hockey	CAA	Big East/American	December 6, 2012	2013	May 1, 2013	New Big East
Bellarmine Knights	Men's lacrosse	ECAC Lacrosse	Atlantic Sun	July 9, 2013	2014	January 9, 2014	SoCon

=== Rumored and possible changes ===
Below is a list of schools that reportedly considered changing conferences during the 2010–13 conference realignment. Speculation more than a year old without further news, or superseded by subsequent events, is shaded.

School	Current conference	Most likely new conference	Other possible conferences
Texas Longhorns	Big 12	Pac-12	Big Ten; Independent
Texas Tech Red Raiders	Big 12	Pac-12	SEC
Oklahoma Sooners	Big 12	Pac-12	SEC
Oklahoma State Cowboys	Big 12	Pac-12	None
Baylor Bears	Big 12	Big East	None
Iowa State Cyclones	Big 12	Big East	None
Kansas State Wildcats	Big 12	Big East	None
Kansas Jayhawks	Big 12	Big East	Pac-12
Air Force Falcons	Mountain West	Big East (football only)	MVC, WCC, or WAC for non-football
Army Black Knights	Patriot League (Independent in football)	Big East (football only)	None
(all C-USA schools)	C-USA	Merged C-USA/Mountain West	None
(all Mountain West schools)	Mountain West	Merged C-USA/Mountain West	None
Connecticut Huskies	Big East/American	ACC	Big Ten
Cincinnati Bearcats	Big East/American	Big 12	ACC
New Mexico State Aggies	WAC	Sun Belt	None
UTEP Miners	Conference USA	Mountain West	None
Tennessee State Tigers	OVC	SWAC	None
Clemson Tigers	ACC	SEC	None
Florida State Seminoles	ACC	SEC	Big 12
Georgia Tech Yellow Jackets	ACC	Big Ten	SEC
BYU Cougars	WCC (Independent in football)	Mountain West	Pac-12
Richmond Spiders	Atlantic 10 (CAA in football)	New Big East	Big East (non-football sports)
Stony Brook Seawolves	America East (Big South in football)	CAA (all sports)	None
San Diego State Aztecs	Mountain West	Pac-12	none
Boise State Broncos	Mountain West	Pac-12	none
Fresno State Bulldogs	Mountain West	Big East	none
UNLV Rebels	Mountain West	Big East	Pac-12
UMass Minutemen	Atlantic 10 (MAC in football)	American	none
Dayton Flyers	Atlantic 10	New Big East	None
Saint Louis Billikens	Atlantic 10	New Big East	None
VCU Rams	Atlantic 10	New Big East	None
Liberty Flames	Big South	Sun Belt	None
James Madison Dukes	CAA	Sun Belt	Conference USA
Sacramento State Hornets women's gymnastics	WAC (women's gymnastics only)	MPSF	None
Illinois-Chicago Flames	Horizon League	MVC	None
Valparaiso Crusaders	Horizon League	MVC	None
UMKC Kangaroos	Summit League (WAC in 2013)	MVC	None
Fairfield Stags	MAAC	CAA	None
Albany Great Danes	America East (moving from NEC to CAA for football)	CAA (all sports)	None
Eastern Kentucky Colonels	OVC	Sun Belt	MAC
