= 2010–2014 NCAA conference realignment =

Administrative process in the NCAA

The 2010–2014 NCAA conference realignment was initiated by Nebraska, Colorado, Missouri, and Texas A&M leaving the Big 12 Conference for the Big 10 Conference, Pac-12 Conference, and Southeastern Conference, resulting in a chain-reaction of extensive changes in conference membership at all three divisions of NCAA competition beginning in the 2010–11 academic year, with over 120 schools changing conference affiliations during this round of realignment, spurred on by increasing evaluations of power conference television media deals. Most of these changes involved conferences in the Football Bowl Subdivision (FBS) of Division I. Every FBS conference gained and/or lost football members, and the Mid-American Conference was the only FBS conference whose all-sports membership did not change. Most notably, two football conferences faced collapse, the old Big East Conference which split into football-sponsoring and non-football sponsoring branches in 2013 with the establishment of the American Athletic Conference, now known as the American Conference for football-focused members, and the new Big East Conference for basketball-focused members, and the Western Athletic Conference which became the first Division I FBS conference to drop football since the Big West Conference did so in 2000. The raiding of other conferences by the Power Five conferences emphasized the differences in scale between programs and conferences, establishing a new era in college sports into the 2010s decade.

== Background ==
Rumors of conference expansion began in December 2009, when Big Ten Conference commissioner Jim Delany announced that the league would consider adding one or more teams. Media reports indicated that the Big Ten had two major motives for expansion, the first being the conference's desire to increase the reach and programming schedule of its cable network, the Big Ten Network. At the time, the conference reportedly received as much as 88 cents per month for every subscriber to the network in the Big Ten member states, and in the 2008–09 fiscal year, the Big Ten Network alone distributed $6.4 million to each of the conference's 11 schools. Second, expanding to 12 or more schools would allow the conference to launch a potentially lucrative conference championship game in football.

Shortly after the Big Ten announced its intention to explore expansion, the Pacific-10 Conference, under new commissioner Larry Scott, announced similar plans. As with the Big Ten, television played a major role in the Pac-10's efforts. The conference's then-current deal with Fox Sports Net was set to expire at the end of the 2010–11 school year, and in the wake of lucrative TV deals recently signed by the ACC and SEC, the Pac-10 felt a need to expand its footprint to gain more leverage in broadcast negotiations. Expansion to at least 12 teams would also allow the Pac-10 to host a conference championship game.

While television was undeniably a factor in the realignment speculation, it was not the only one; Notre Dame athletic director Jack Swarbrick claimed that at most schools, realignment was being driven primarily by university administrators who saw an opportunity to improve the academic image of their schools—not by athletic directors. Also, for at least three schools—Hawaiʻi, Belmont, and Denver—travel costs played a major role in their decisions to change conferences.

The realignment process consumed much of the resources of conference administrators. Karl Benson, who was commissioner of the Western Athletic Conference (WAC) when the cycle started and became Sun Belt Conference commissioner in March 2012, estimated that about 90 percent of his workload in his first two months as Sun Belt commissioner had been taken up by realignment-related issues—either recruiting new members or trying to keep current members in the conference.

== Major FBS conferences affected ==
=== Big Ten Conference ===
==== First wave ====
After the Big Ten's initial announcement that it was looking at expansion in December 2009, rumors about possible expansion targets and the possibility that the conference might expand to as many as 14 or 16 teams circulated into May 2010.

On June 11, 2010, Nebraska applied for membership in the Big Ten and was unanimously approved as the conference's 12th school. Its membership became effective July 1, 2011.

Big Ten officials later stated that they had no plans to expand beyond 12 teams in the near future.

==== Second wave ====
However, in mid-November 2012, the landscape changed, as ESPN reported that the University of Maryland, a charter member of the Atlantic Coast Conference (ACC), was in "serious negotiations" to join the Big Ten, ultimately concluding in the Big Ten making an offer to Maryland to join the conference. Rutgers University of the Big East Conference was also reported to be in consideration to join the Big Ten as well.

On November 19, 2012, the Maryland regents voted to accept the Big Ten's offer, and the Big Ten presidents unanimously approved Maryland's entry later that day. Rutgers announced the day after that they would also join the Big Ten. Maryland and Rutgers officially became the thirteenth and fourteenth Big Ten members on July 1, 2014.

=== Pac-12 Conference ===
On June 7, 2010, the universities of the Pac-10 approved potential expansion plans and authorized commissioner Larry Scott to move ahead with expansion and issue invitations to six prospective schools: Colorado, Oklahoma, Oklahoma State, Texas, Texas A&M, and Texas Tech.

On June 10, 2010, the Pac-10 announced that Colorado would be joining the conference in 2012. In the following days, rumors circulated that Texas, Texas Tech, Oklahoma, and Oklahoma State might follow suit and join the Pac-10 as soon as June 15, 2010, though Texas had not yet made a final decision.

On June 14, Pac-10 Commissioner Larry Scott revealed that Texas had rejected the offer to join the conference. Shortly thereafter Oklahoma, Oklahoma State, Texas A&M, and Texas Tech pledged to follow suit and stay in the Big 12. Consequently, there was widespread belief that Utah would be offered an invitation to become the 12th member of the Pac-10 in order to ensure an even number of members and allow the Pac-10 to have a football conference championship game.

On June 17, Utah accepted an invitation to join the conference as its 12th member.

On September 21, 2010, Colorado and the Big 12 reached an agreement to allow Colorado to join the Pac-10 a year earlier in 2011.

=== Big East Conference and American Athletic Conference ===
Six Big East schools departed for other conferences. These include West Virginia to the Big 12 in 2012; Pittsburgh, Syracuse and Notre Dame to the Atlantic Coast Conference (ACC) in 2013, followed by Louisville in 2014; and Rutgers to the Big Ten in 2014. The seven remaining non-FBS football schools, DePaul, Georgetown, Marquette, Providence, St. John's, Seton Hall and Villanova, announced in December 2012 that they would leave as a group and form a new non-football conference under the Big East name. Joining them in the revamped Big East were Creighton of the Missouri Valley Conference and Butler and Xavier of the Atlantic 10.

The remaining three members of the old Big East (Cincinnati, Connecticut, and South Florida) formed the American Athletic Conference along with nine other schools: UCF, East Carolina, Houston, Memphis, SMU, Temple, Tulsa, and Tulane as full members, and Navy for football only. Three additional schools, TCU, Boise State and San Diego State had announced plans to join the old Big East but later backed out as the number of football members dwindled. The American dropped the word "Athletic" from its name in July 2025, becoming simply the American Conference.

=== Big 12 Conference ===
In June 2010, former Big Eight members Nebraska and Colorado announced their departures for the Big Ten and PAC-10, respectively. The Big 12 survived total collapse in the following days when its most prominent football schools (Oklahoma, Oklahoma State, Texas, Texas A&M, and Texas Tech) turned down offers from the Pac-10 to form a 16-team "superconference". The Big 12 was forced to discontinue its football championship game after membership fell below twelve, the minimum number of schools then required to hold such a game.

Two more schools departed in 2012 when Texas A&M and Missouri left to join the Southeastern Conference. The Big 12 responded by adding TCU of the Mountain West (formerly committed to join the Big East) and West Virginia of the Big East to keep conference membership at 10 schools.

After the Big 12 was shut out of the initial College Football Playoff in 2014 despite TCU and Baylor finishing as co-champions at 11-1, there was speculation that the Big 12 might expand back to 12 or more teams in order to resume the Big 12 Championship Game for football. In 2016, the NCAA removed its rule requiring FBS conferences to have at least 12 football members to hold a championship game, allowing the Big 12 to reinstate its championship game with only 10 teams, starting with the 2017 season.

=== Atlantic Coast Conference ===
Meanwhile, the ACC also faced the rumors of members leaving for the SEC or other conferences. As with the Big East (though the ACC did not have any non-football members until Notre Dame joined in 2013) the rumors were fueled by perceived tension between the basketball powerhouse "Tobacco Road" programs (Duke, North Carolina, North Carolina State and Wake Forest) and the football-dominant schools (primarily Clemson, Virginia Tech, University of Miami, and Florida State) as to whether it should add members with strong basketball programs or those with stronger football programs.

In light of the rumors, the Atlantic Coast Conference (ACC) voted unanimously on September 13, 2011, to raise its exit fees to $20 million. At the same time, multiple schools were rumored as possibilities to join the ACC. On September 18, 2011, the University of Pittsburgh and Syracuse University officially applied to join the ACC. The applications were accepted later that day. Both teams were from the Big East Conference. They rejoined Virginia Tech, the University of Miami, and Boston College who defected from the Big East in 2003. Even Jim Boeheim, who at the time had played or coached men's basketball at Syracuse for nearly 50 years, did not know about the change in affiliation before it occurred. Pittsburgh and Syracuse ultimately negotiated a buyout that enabled them to join the ACC in 2013.

On September 12, 2012, the conference announced that the University of Notre Dame would become the conference's 15th member, moving all of its intercollegiate sports except for football, men's ice hockey, and fencing into the conference (the ACC at the time did not sponsor the latter two sports, however ACC fencing was reinstated in 2014-15 and Notre Dame fencing joined the conference). As part of the agreement, the football team now plays five games each season with ACC opponents. There remained speculation regarding the timing of the change until March 12, 2013, when it was announced that the Big East would allow Notre Dame to leave for the ACC after the 2012–13 academic year.

At the same time that Notre Dame's future arrival was originally announced, the ACC also instituted an even more massive increase in exit fees. The fee is now set at three times the conference's annual operating budget; for 2012–13, the fee would be roughly $50 million. This, however, was not enough to keep Maryland from announcing a 2014 move to the Big Ten.

On November 28, 2012, the ACC voted to accept Louisville as its 14th member, replacing Maryland. On July 1, 2014, Maryland left the ACC and Louisville joined the ACC.

=== Southeastern Conference ===
While the Southeastern Conference has made few changes, the conference's 2011 addition of Texas A&M and later of Missouri from the Big 12 Conference set off the second wave of major conference realignment. Several other schools were rumored as potential expansion candidates, but none of these rumors proved true until the summer of 2021, when the announcement that Oklahoma and Texas would join the SEC no later than 2025 triggered the next major D-I realignment. No schools have left the conference since the 1966 departure of Tulane.

== Other FBS conferences affected ==
=== Mountain West Conference ===
Three schools that had been members at the beginning of the realignment cycle announced plans to join other conferences (the University of Utah, BYU and TCU), and six schools announced plans to join the conference (Boise State University, San Jose State University, California State University, Fresno (generally known as Fresno State), the University of Nevada and Utah State University joined as all-sports members and the University of Hawaii joined for football only). Two schools—one a pre-2010 member (San Diego State University), and the other joining during the cycle (Boise State University)—had announced their upcoming departure, but later decided to stay in the MW.

=== Conference USA ===
On October 14, 2011 Conference USA (C-USA) (Note: Conference USA abandoned the "C-USA" branding in 2023, now using "CUSA" as its official abbreviation.) and the Mountain West Conference announced they would enter into a football-only alliance, forming a 22-team league. The league would span 15 states and 5 time zones.

However, following further defections from both conferences, the two leagues decided to enter into talks on a full merger. In early February 2012, ESPN.com reported that the C-USA board of directors was to meet to discuss the merger. However, this merger idea was later scrapped, because of lost revenue from NCAA tournaments. The Mountain West ultimately regained members, thus making this idea unnecessary.

Attrition from C-USA continued, with the former Big East recruiting more than half its members: UCF, Houston, Memphis and SMU left in 2013, and East Carolina, Tulane, and Tulsa in 2014. To replace them C-USA turned to the Sun Belt for Florida Atlantic, Florida International, Middle Tennessee, North Texas, and Western Kentucky; the WAC for Louisiana Tech and UT-San Antonio; the Atlantic 10 for former C-USA member Charlotte; and the CAA for Old Dominion. The last two schools had formerly been non-football schools, but ODU began sponsoring football in 2009 (2014 in FBS) and Charlotte in 2013.

=== Western Athletic Conference ===
From 2011 to 2014, the WAC saw a near-total replacement of its membership. The departure of Boise State in 2011 for the Mountain West, to be followed by Nevada and Fresno State the next year, kicked off sequential rounds of additions and departures that brought in Denver, UTSA, Texas State, UT Arlington and Seattle, but saw the announced departure of all of the newly added schools except Seattle, along with Hawaiʻi, Utah State, San Jose State, Louisiana Tech and Idaho, leaving only New Mexico State and new member Seattle, thereby endangering the survival of the league. Reorganizing as a non-football conference, they repopulated their ranks with Chicago State, UT-Pan American (since merged into UTRGV), Utah Valley, CSU Bakersfield, UMKC (now known athletically as Kansas City) and Division II Grand Canyon University, but since none of these schools participate in women's gymnastics the conference dropped the sport. The WAC also added men's soccer in order to maintain its status as a Division I conference, recruiting four schools from the Mountain Pacific Sports Federation soccer league to join the three WAC members that sponsored the sport at that time.

=== Mid-American Conference ===
On April 19, 2011, several media outlets reported that the University of Massachusetts Amherst (also known as UMass) would upgrade its football program to FBS level and become an affiliate member of the Mid-American Conference (MAC), effective in 2013, for that sport only. The formal announcement came the following day at a joint UMass–MAC press conference; the effective date of UMass' move was 2012, with full FBS membership and eligibility for the conference championship coming in 2013. The school continues to maintain all other current conference affiliations, mostly in the Atlantic 10 Conference. At the time of the announcement, the A-10 was also home to Temple University, whose football team was in the MAC; however, by the time UMass football arrived in the MAC, Temple's football program had left for the Big East, and that school had announced that the rest of its athletic program would join the Big East a year later.

As a part of this football upgrade, the Minutemen moved from the 17,000-seat Warren McGuirk Alumni Stadium on its Amherst campus, whose capacity was only modestly above the NCAA's then-current requirement of 15,000 average attendance for FBS football. (Note: NCAA Division I eliminated FBS attendance requirements in 2023.) In 2012, they played their home games 93 miles (150 km) away at Gillette Stadium in Foxborough, the 69,000-seat home of the NFL's New England Patriots and the New England Revolution of MLS. UMass initially planned to expand McGuirk Stadium to a capacity of 25,000, and hopes to eventually return at least some games to campus, but was contractually obligated to play all of its home games in 2012 and 2013, plus four games in each season from 2014 to 2016, at Gillette Stadium. The renovation plans were later scaled down, with McGuirk Stadium being modernized but not appreciably expanded.

The Minutemen played two seasons as a football affiliate before being offered full membership in the MAC. However, UMass declined, and shortly afterward, the MAC announced the Minutemen would no longer be an affiliate with them effective for the 2015 season, instead playing as an FBS Independent. Ultimately, this meant that despite these changes in football membership, the MAC was the only FBS conference whose full-time membership did not change during this realignment cycle. The core membership was initially unaffected by the early-2020s realignment, but that changed in 2024 when the MAC announced that UMass would return to the conference in 2025, this time as a full member. Before the 2025 arrival of UMass, the last change to the MAC's core membership was Marshall's departure for Conference USA in 2005.

=== Sun Belt Conference ===
The Sun Belt Conference had seen little effect from the first several rounds of realignment, with the only change being the loss of non-football member Denver to the WAC. Although South Alabama had announced it would establish an FBS football program and join the Sun Belt football league in 2012, this move was finalized before the Big Ten and Pac-10 set the realignment process into motion.

The Sun Belt's next move was to bring back one of its charter members, FCS upgrader Georgia State, effective in 2013. Soon afterwards, it became a target for C-USA after that conference lost several members to the American Athletic Conference. FIU, Florida Atlantic, Middle Tennessee, and North Texas all left for C-USA in 2013, and Western Kentucky did the same in 2014. The Sun Belt initially reloaded by adding new FBS member Texas State and non-football UT Arlington, both from the WAC, effective in 2013. It added four more members, two in all sports and two for football only, in 2014. Appalachian State and Georgia Southern, both from the FCS Southern Conference, started their FBS transitions in 2013 (remaining in the Southern Conference, ineligible for the conference title and the FCS playoffs, at that time), joined the Sun Belt in 2014, and became full FBS members in 2015. After the WAC dropped football, Idaho, a former football-only Sun Belt member, and New Mexico State, formerly an all-sports member, both returned for football after one season as FBS independents. On September 1, 2015, the Sun Belt announced that Coastal Carolina of the FCS Big South would join the Sun Belt in 2016 as an all sports-member; however, the football program, as part of its FBS transition, played the 2016 season as an FCS independent, and joined the Sun Belt in football in 2017 (being postseason-eligible only if the team has more than six wins, and more games than six-win eligible teams), becoming fully eligible in 2018. On March 1, 2016, the Sun Belt announced that it would not renew Idaho's and New Mexico State's football associate memberships after 2017.

== FCS conferences affected ==
The Division I Football Championship Subdivision (FCS) also saw major changes, the most significant being the collapse of the Great West Conference, which dropped football after the 2011 season before folding completely in 2013.

=== Big Sky Conference ===
Conference realignment came to the second-tier Division I FCS in September 2010, when the Big Sky Conference increased its profile in California by inviting two schools from that state—California Polytechnic State University (Cal Poly SLO) and the University of California, Davis (UC Davis)—to join as football-only members. Both schools accepted; no firm date was set at that time, but both were expected to play a full Big Sky schedule starting no later than 2013. The two ultimately began Big Sky play in 2012.

Cal Poly SLO and UC Davis had previously been full members of the non-football Big West Conference, and at the time of the move had associate football-only memberships in the Great West Conference. Their move to the Big Sky gave them the chance to compete for an automatic bid in the FCS playoffs, which the Great West did not have at any time in its football history. From the Big Sky's perspective, the move expanded their presence in California (Sacramento State was already a full member), and also gave the conference the ability to contend for more at-large berths in the FCS playoffs. In order to accommodate this move, the Big Sky school presidents approved an exception to the league bylaws, which normally require member schools to compete in all conference sports. The addition of Cal Poly SLO and UC Davis tentatively gave the Big Sky 11 football members; at that time, the conference was reportedly planning to expand to 12 football members in the future.

As it turned out, the conference would expand even further, issuing invitations to the University of North Dakota and Southern Utah University to become full members on October 29. On November 1, the Big Sky announced that both schools had accepted and would join effective with the 2012–13 academic year. Southern Utah moved from The Summit League, in which it was a full member, and the Great West football conference. North Dakota previously competed in the Great West for most sports, but was not eligible for Division I postseason competition (except in ice hockey) because it had been in transition from Division II since the 2007–08 academic year. UND completed its transition in 2012, at the same time it joined the Big Sky. The conference also announced that the University of South Dakota was on the verge of becoming a full member as well. South Dakota, then a Great West member, also began its transition to Division I in 2007–08.

A report by the Grand Forks Herald on October 29 shed more light on the second round of Big Sky expansion. Both UND and USD were seeking a stable home for their respective football programs. USD had accepted an invitation to join The Summit League in 2011, and UND was seeking membership in that conference as well. There had been speculation for several months that The Summit League would merge with the Missouri Valley Football Conference (MVFC), which would have provided both schools a football home alongside their respective in-state rivals, North Dakota State and South Dakota State. However, no momentum had developed for such a move in fall 2010, which led both UND and USD to reevaluate their options. In the end, USD turned down the Big Sky offer (see below).

The Big Sky's next move came in October 2012, when one of its charter members, the University of Idaho, announced its return to the conference in July 2014. Idaho had been one of the six original members of the Big Sky in 1963, and remained in the conference until 1996. The Vandals joined for all sports except football, which it was planning to play as an FBS independent before rejoining the Sun Belt football conference.

By returning to the Big Sky, Idaho rejoined a conference with numerous regional rivals, most notably cross-state rival Idaho State. Another Big Sky rivalry, against Eastern Washington, dates to 1905, and rivalries with two other Big Sky members, Montana and Montana State, were then more than 90 years old.

=== Missouri Valley Football Conference ===
Ultimately, South Dakota decided to turn down the offer of Big Sky membership after receiving an invitation to join the MVFC on November 3, 2010. Their acceptance, which was officially announced the following day, took effect in 2012, when USD became fully eligible for Division I postseason competition. This move also meant that USD followed through with its announced plans to join The Summit League in 2011.

=== Ohio Valley Conference ===
On May 13, 2011, the Ohio Valley Conference (OVC) and Belmont University jointly announced that Belmont would leave the non-football Atlantic Sun Conference to become the 12th member of the OVC in July 2012. Belmont became the second OVC member in Nashville, joining Tennessee State; the OVC headquarters are in the suburb of Brentwood. Three other member schools are located in Tennessee (Austin Peay, Tennessee Tech, and UT–Martin), and a fourth (Murray State) is in a Kentucky county that borders Tennessee.

Belmont had aspirations of joining the OVC while it was transitioning from NAIA to NCAA Division I, but could not at the time because the OVC then required all members to sponsor football. This rule does not exist today—two other then-current OVC members did not play football in the conference, with Morehead State playing non-scholarship football in the Pioneer Football League and SIU Edwardsville not sponsoring the sport. (While Belmont eventually left the OVC in 2022, Morehead State and SIUE remain in the OVC today, and the OVC now has two other non-football members in Little Rock and Southern Indiana.) Belmont president Dr. Robert C. Fisher unequivocally denied any interest in starting a football program, stating "Football is not on the back burner. It's not on any burner."

Belmont had to pay a $200,000 exit fee to the Atlantic Sun. However, Belmont AD Mike Strickland said, "...ballpark, I think it is going to be well over $250,000 a year in savings because we fly a lot in the Atlantic Sun. Half the places in the OVC we won't spend the night, so it will be a great savings and hopefully we can reinvest that in our programs." Fisher shared that sentiment, adding, "We will more than make that up in travel costs the first year. We don't have to get on an airplane. The longest trip we have to take in the OVC is about the same distance as our shortest trip outside of Nashville to play an A-Sun team." Although Belmont left behind an in-city rival in Lipscomb, all involved with the move wished that rivalry to continue. Ultimately, both Belmont and Lipscomb announced their basketball series would continue with home-and-home games each season, unusual among non-conference rivalries.

Belmont also became the first private school in the OVC since Samford University left for the Southern Conference in 2008, and only the third ever to compete in the conference (the University of Evansville was the first).

=== Southland Conference ===
On October 25, 2011, the conference announced Oral Roberts University would join in 2012 from The Summit League. Nearly a month later, on November 21, the Southland added Houston Baptist University (renamed Houston Christian University in 2022) as a member to join one year later, in 2013. Houston Baptist also announced intentions to start a football program, which would begin play in the Southland in 2014.

The conference was not done with expansion; on August 20, 2012, it announced that the University of the Incarnate Word (UIW) would join alongside Houston Baptist in 2013. Since UIW upgraded from the Division II Lone Star Conference, it was not eligible for Division I postseason play until the 2017–18 school year. In football, it began playing a full Southland schedule in 2014–15, the same year that it was first counted as a Division I school for NCAA scheduling purposes.

Three days after the UIW announcement, the conference announced that a third school, the University of New Orleans, would join in 2013. After Hurricane Katrina caused major damage to the university and led to a substantial drop in enrollment, UNO had applied at different times for Division III and Division II membership. However, a change in UNO's leadership led to the Privateers remaining in Division I. On August 25, Abilene Christian University, a charter member of the Southland but for the last forty years playing in Division II, announced that they too would be promoting their programs from the Lone Star Conference to rejoin the Southland.

Oral Roberts would ultimately spend only two years in the Southland Conference, returning to the Summit League in 2014.

=== Big South Conference ===
The Big South Conference, made up of a mix of smaller public and private institutions in the South Atlantic states, had 10 members when the realignment cycle started in 2010, but had committed to bringing back charter member Campbell University in 2011, making for a somewhat awkward 11-member lineup.

On January 23, 2012, the Big South announced Longwood University, a small public school in Farmville, Virginia, as its 12th member, effective in 2012–13. The Lancers, which then (as now) had no football program, had been independent since moving up from Division II in 2007, and had sought membership in a Division I conference. After the Big South invitation came, Longwood athletic director Troy Austin said the school's athletic program now had "a place to call home", and longtime Lancers baseball coach Buddy Bolding called the move "the best thing to happen at Longwood since coeducation and university status." (Longwood, founded in 1839, had been an all-women's school until 1976, and did not become a university until 2002.) The addition of Longwood allowed the Big South to split into divisions, and also balanced the league's geographic distribution, giving it a fourth Virginia member along with the four from both North and South Carolina.

About a month after Longwood became a Big South member, the football side of the conference suffered a significant blow with the loss of football-only associate Stony Brook to CAA Football, the technically separate football league operated by the Colonial Athletic Association (CAA; now the Coastal Athletic Association). The Seawolves' move left the Big South with only six schools in its football league—one of which, Liberty, had announced plans to leave the Big South and upgrade to FBS football once it received an invitation from an FBS conference. The NCAA requires that conferences have at least six members to maintain their automatic berths in the FCS playoffs.

With that in mind, the Big South announced on February 14, 2013 that Monmouth University, set to leave the Northeast Conference (NEC) for the Metro Atlantic Athletic Conference (MAAC) in July 2013, would become a football-only associate in 2014. Monmouth was seeking a new home for its football program because its new conference has not sponsored the sport since 2007. The move was a significant upgrade for Monmouth football; at that time, the NEC imposed a limit of 40 full scholarship equivalents in football (which has since increased to 45), while the Big South then (as now) allowed the FCS maximum of 63. In order to more effectively manage the transition, Monmouth competed as an FCS independent in 2013 before playing a full Big South schedule in 2014. The initial agreement between the Big South and Monmouth was for four seasons, and Monmouth remained a Big South football member until joining both the all-sports CAA and CAA Football in 2022.

On September 1, 2015, Coastal Carolina announced that it would depart from the Big South to the FBS Sun Belt Conference in 2016 for all sports except football, which joined the conference in 2017 in its second year of the FBS transition.

=== Patriot League ===
Realignment reached still further into the ranks of mid-major schools when Boston University, a charter member of the America East Conference, announced on June 15, 2012 that it would depart for the Patriot League in 2013. The BU ice hockey teams for both men and women remained in Hockey East, as the Patriot League does not sponsor the sport. In an irony, the Patriot League, which began in 1986 as the football-only Colonial League before becoming an all-sports conference in 1990, brought in a school that dropped football in 1997. The official announcement of the conference move made no mention of football.

According to BU athletic director Mike Lynch, the school had been in exploratory talks with the Patriot League "for four or five years" prior to the announcement. Ultimately, the school's administration saw the move as what Lynch called "an opportunity to go someplace that's extremely stable with brand-name institutions."

The Terriers' move was seen as a major blow to their former conference. At the time of BU's announcement, it had won the previous seven America East Commissioner's Cups for all-sports performance, collecting 40 conference championships in that period. The departure of BU left the America East with eight members; one of them, Stony Brook, was reportedly a CAA expansion target, and eventually joined CAA Football, the technically separate football arm of the CAA (see 2010–2013 Colonial Athletic Association realignment), while otherwise remaining in the America East. BU itself had reportedly been a CAA target before announcing its move.

Like the CAA, the America East has a bylaw that allows the conference to prohibit a departing school from participating in any conference postseason tournament. The America East chose to enforce this rule against BU in its lame-duck 2012–13 America East season. In turn, this meant that the 2012–13 Terriers could not receive an automatic bid to any NCAA championship that was linked to an America East tournament, most notably the NCAA men's and women's basketball tournaments.

The Patriot League was not finished with expansion. On August 29, 2012, it announced that Loyola University Maryland, then in the Metro Atlantic Athletic Conference (MAAC), would join in 2013. The Baltimore-based Greyhounds were coming off what The Baltimore Sun called "the most successful athletic year in school history", including the men's basketball team's first trip to the NCAA Tournament since 1994, an NCAA quarterfinal berth by the women's lacrosse team, and a national championship for the men's lacrosse team. While most of Loyola's sports were housed in the MAAC at the time of its announcement, the school's lacrosse teams played elsewhere—the men's team in the ECAC and the women's team in the Big East. Like BU, Loyola does not sponsor football, and as with the BU announcement, the Loyola announcement did not mention that sport.

Current Loyola athletic director Jim Paquette indicated that the move was dictated by academics as much as athletics, saying, "The Patriot League has been a very strong academic league, and at the same time it was very strong in athletics, so it was very appealing to us. We believe we're going to a conference that values both very highly, and we know we can be successful" Former Loyola AD Joe Boylan noted that the school had first discussed joining the Patriot League in the late 1990s. He echoed his successor's sentiments, saying, "I think it's a very significant move. I think it says a lot about where the institution is from the academic side and the national profile side. I think it aligns them with the second Ivy League and it reinforces the school's profile as a fairly top-level academic institution."

=== Colonial Athletic Association ===
After having been raided by several other conferences in the preceding months, the CAA initially decided to reload with football in mind. On August 7, 2012, the conference announced that it would add Albany and Stony Brook as members of CAA Football in 2013. At the time of the announcement, both schools were full members of the America East with associate football memberships elsewhere—Albany in the Northeast Conference (NEC) and Stony Brook in the Big South Conference. Both remained America East members. In a postscript, Stony Brook would eventually join the all-sports CAA in 2022, a year before the conference changed its name to Coastal Athletic Association.

=== Southern Conference ===
The Southern Conference lost 5 members and gained 3 between 2013 and 2014. The College of Charleston departed the SoCon in 2013, joining the CAA. Appalachian State and Georgia Southern began transitions to the FBS level in 2013. Both Appalachian State and Georgia Southern remained on the Southern Conference schedule for the 2013 season; however, both teams were ineligible for the league championship and playoffs. Both schools joined the Sun Belt Conference in 2014, becoming bowl eligible in 2015. The other two departing members Elon and Davidson joined the CAA and Atlantic 10, respectively.

Two of the three schools joining the SoCon in 2014 were past members. Both VMI and East Tennessee State left the SoCon in 2003, joining the Big South and Atlantic Sun, respectively. Football upstart Mercer departed from the Atlantic Sun to join the SoCon in all sports.

== Non-football Division I conferences affected ==
=== West Coast Conference ===
The first non-football conference to make a significant move during this realignment cycle was the West Coast Conference (WCC), which officially invited Mountain West member Brigham Young University (BYU) on August 31, 2010. The move to the WCC, which followed a period in which BYU had flirted with a return to its one-time conference home of the WAC, gave BYU's non-football sports a home while its football program chose to become independent.

The WCC was not finished with expansion; on March 28, 2012, the WCC welcomed back one of its charter members when it announced that the University of the Pacific would rejoin the conference in July 2013. Pacific had been one of the five original members of what was then the California Basketball Association in 1952, but moved its non-football sports to the Pacific Coast Athletic Association (PCAA), now the Big West Conference, in 1971. (Pacific's football team, previously an independent, joined the PCAA at the league's founding in 1969.)

Both BYU and Pacific fit into the WCC's pre-realignment profile of a conference consisting entirely of private, faith-based institutions (all WCC members in 2010 were Catholic except for Pepperdine University, affiliated with the Churches of Christ). BYU is the flagship school of the Church of Jesus Christ of Latter-day Saints. Pacific was founded by Methodists in 1851 and retains an affiliation with the United Methodist Church, although it is now officially non-denominational and has not received financial support from the church since 1969.

According to The Record, the daily newspaper of Pacific's home city of Stockton, California, "Pacific's administration. . . had a long-stated desire to join the WCC, because they felt it was a better fit academically, geographically and financially." Pacific was an outlier in the PCAA/Big West throughout its tenure in that conference; despite many membership changes, it is the only private school to have ever been a member. It had joined the PCAA to accommodate football, but after the school dropped the sport in 1995, it had openly sought to rejoin the WCC. However, the WCC, whose membership had been stable with eight schools since 1980, showed no interest because of the lack of available private institutions that would bring the conference membership to 10. Once BYU came on board, the WCC then sought to add a 10th member to ease scheduling, with Pacific becoming an obvious choice, especially after Seattle (also a Catholic institution) chose to join the WAC.

By moving to the WCC, Pacific rejoined a conference with institutions closer to its size and mission. BYU, with an enrollment of nearly 33,000, was the only WCC member with an enrollment in five figures, remaining so until its 2023 departure for the Big 12 Conference. Also, the WCC's profile in Pacific's major revenue sport of men's basketball had steadily increased in recent years, with the conference's highest-profile program of Gonzaga joined by Saint Mary's and (through 2022–23) BYU as frequent NCAA tournament entrants. At the time of Pacific's return, the WCC had a broadcast contract with ESPN, running through 2018–19, that guaranteed each conference member at least three national television appearances per season on one of ESPN's networks.

=== Atlantic Sun Conference ===
On May 13, 2011, Belmont University announced it was leaving the Atlantic Sun Conference (Note: The conference branded itself as the ASUN Conference from 2016 to 2023. It continues to use "ASUN" as its official abbreviation.) for the Ohio Valley Conference. On December 8, 2011, the conference announced Northern Kentucky University would join in 2012. Because Northern Kentucky came to the Atlantic Sun from the Division II Great Lakes Valley Conference, the Norse had to undergo a four-year transition period (with the exception of their cross country, golf, and track and field programs), with all teams gaining postseason eligibility for the 2016–17 academic year. Mercer and East Tennessee State left for the Southern Conference in 2014.

=== Atlantic 10 Conference ===
The Atlantic 10 (A-10) had suffered a major blow with the loss of traditional conference power Temple to the Big East in March 2012. Unlike the realignment moves in FBS (which were largely driven by football) the A-10 (which does not sponsor football) made moves with basketball in mind, as the A-10 is one of the strongest basketball-centric conferences.

When it became clear that Temple was on its way out, the A-10 entered into talks with Butler University of the Horizon League and George Mason University and Virginia Commonwealth University (VCU) of the CAA. While initially George Mason opted out, VCU and Butler entered the conference in 2012, only to see Butler and Xavier University depart the Atlantic 10 for the newly formed non-football Big East in 2013. George Mason then agreed to join the conference, while Davidson College of the Southern Conference would be added for the 2014-15 school year.

=== America East Conference ===
The America East eventually offset the loss of Boston University by adding University of Massachusetts Lowell on February 13, 2013. UMass Lowell upgraded all of its sports teams to Division I from the Division II Northeast-10 Conference, with the exception of men's ice hockey, which already competed in Division I as a member of Hockey East. The River Hawks began competition in America East in the 2013–14 academic year, but all UML teams except for ice hockey were ineligible for postseason play until the 2017–18 academic year due to their Division I transition period. Since Lowell is within the Boston metropolitan area, the addition of UML allowed the America East to keep their presence in the Boston television market.

=== Metro Atlantic Athletic Conference ===
The MAAC, after having lost Loyola to the Patriot League, sought to shore up its numbers, and also took an opportunity to expand further within its Northeastern footprint. On December 14, 2012, the conference announced that two schools from the Northeast Conference (NEC)—Monmouth University, located in New Jersey, and Quinnipiac University, located in Connecticut—would both join the MAAC in July 2013. Quinnipiac became the second MAAC member from Connecticut, joining Fairfield, while Monmouth joined two other New Jersey schools in Rider and Saint Peter's.

At the time, the MAAC was reportedly seeking to expand to 12 members, with Wagner College, an NEC member located on Staten Island, being seen as the likeliest candidate for the 12th slot. However, Wagner reportedly had second thoughts about the financial commitments involved. If and when the MAAC reaches 12 members, each school is set to have a regional travel partner; Monmouth was expected to be Rider's partner, and presumably Fairfield and Quinnipiac would be paired.

These moves were closely monitored by the New Jersey Institute of Technology (NJIT), which at the time was the only member of the Great West Conference that had not announced plans to join another league for the 2013–14 school year. With NJIT long seeking to join a conference with an automatic bid to the NCAA basketball tournaments, the school was expected to push hard for an invitation to either the NEC or the America East Conference. The moves of Monmouth and Quinnipiac opened up potential NEC slots, while the America East was set to lose Boston University to the Patriot League in July 2013. According to a report by The Star-Ledger of Newark, the America East was more interested than the NEC in inviting NJIT. (NJIT would spend two years as a Division I independent before joining the Atlantic Sun Conference in 2015, and moved to the America East in 2020.)

=== Missouri Valley Conference ===
As the Big East basketball schools re-formed as a non-football conference retaining the Big East name, they invited Missouri Valley member Creighton University to join them, along with Xavier and Butler of the Atlantic-10. The MVC courted several potential replacements including UMKC, set to join the WAC from the Summit League, and Valparaiso, UIC and Loyola Chicago of the Horizon League. On April 15, 2013, it was reported that Loyola Chicago would accept an invitation to join the Missouri Valley Conference in July 2013.

=== Great West Conference ===
The Great West had formerly been a football-only conference, but in response to departures in 2008 had added several schools moving up from Division II and become an all-sports conference. The year 2011 saw the departure of South Dakota State for the Summit League for all sports except football, which sport they took to the Missouri Valley Football Conference in 2012. The departure of the remaining football-sponsoring members North Dakota State and Southern Utah, and football-only members Cal Poly and UC Davis the same year led the conference to drop the sport. Houston Baptist then committed to join the Southland Conference in 2013, and the rebuilding WAC took Chicago State, Texas-Pan American and Utah Valley. The sole remaining full member, New Jersey Institute of Technology, was reported to be seeking a new home, effectively ending the Great West.

=== Horizon League ===
In May 2012, Butler University announced it would leave the Horizon League for the Atlantic 10 Conference for the 2013–2014 school year, but later reached an agreement with the Horizon League on departing early, with Butler starting A-10 play at the beginning of the 2012–13 school year. The loss of charter member Butler to a stronger conference, regardless of conference realignment activity elsewhere, had been expected by Horizon League officials due to Butler's rise as a national championship-contending men's basketball team under then-head coach Brad Stevens. Butler ultimately only spent one year in the A-10 before moving on to the reconfigured Big East Conference.

Initially, the Horizon League chose not to expand to replace Butler, as the school still had nine full-time members, including Valparaiso University within the state of Indiana, whose capital of Indianapolis is home to both Butler and the Horizon League headquarters. However, the split of the original Big East Conference, leading to the formation of the current Big East, had further fallout involving the Horizon League. Loyola University Chicago, the last remaining charter member from the Horizon League's founding in 1979, announced in April 2013 that it would leave the Horizon effective July 1 to join the Missouri Valley Conference, which itself had lost Creighton to the reconfigured Big East. Within a month, the Horizon had announced that Loyola would immediately be replaced by Oakland University, formerly of The Summit League. The addition of Oakland brought in a natural rival to the University of Detroit Mercy and kept the Horizon League at nine full-time members. Butler's spot in the Horizon League would eventually be filled in 2015 with the addition of Northern Kentucky University, which also served to expand the conference into the Upland South.

== Division II realignment ==
=== Great American Conference ===
Talks of creating a conference for the Oklahoma and Arkansas schools in Division II had been in the works since the early 1990s. In November 2009, representatives from East Central University, Southwestern Oklahoma, and Southeastern Oklahoma met to discuss forming a new conference. In April 2010, the presidents of the charter universities met to discuss the creation of the conference.

On June 13, 2010, the above-named schools plus the University of Arkansas at Monticello, Arkansas Tech University, Harding University, Henderson State University, Ouachita Baptist University, and Southern Arkansas agreed to form a new NCAA Division II conference, leaving their conferences (the Gulf South Conference and the Lone Star Conference). On November 23 of that year, the league's council of presidents announced that the conference name would be the Great American Conference.

On May 10, 2011, the GAC conference extended provisional memberships to two additional schools: Northwestern Oklahoma State University (which will join in 2013) and Southern Nazarene University (which joined in 2012).

=== West Virginia Intercollegiate Athletic Conference ===
On June 18, 2012, it was reported that the 9 football playing schools and Wheeling Jesuit (now Wheeling) would form a new conference, breaking ties with the remaining five non-football schools. Most of these schools soon became charter members of the Mountain East Conference.

== Division III realignment ==
=== Southern Collegiate Athletic Conference ===
For many years, the Southern Collegiate Athletic Conference (SCAC) had an unusually large geographic footprint by Division III standards. Traditionally, its primary membership criterion has been academics, with geography being only secondary—all of its members have been private, with admissions policies ranging from fairly selective to highly so. Travel issues have therefore been a major factor in schools' decisions to join or leave the conference, and this proved especially true in the early 2010s.

The first move within this conference in the 2010–12 cycle came on June 9, 2010 when DePauw University (located in Indiana) announced it would leave the SCAC for the North Coast Athletic Conference after the 2010–11 academic year, citing its desire for "a less strenuous and more environmentally friendly travel regimen for our teams." DePauw's place was taken by the University of Dallas, which announced on September 22 that it would join three other Texas schools already in the conference. These moves proved to be a harbinger of more extensive movement to come in 2011.

On May 4, 2011, DePauw's student newspaper, The DePauw, reported that four SCAC members – Centre College, Hendrix College, Rhodes College, and Sewanee: The University of the South – had notified the conference that they planned to leave after the 2011–12 school year, also citing travel concerns. Just over a month later, on June 7, seven schools (the four already named plus Birmingham–Southern College, Millsaps College, and Oglethorpe University) announced that they would leave the SCAC after 2011–12 to form a new conference. These schools were joined by Berry College, at that time an independent D-III program, to form what would eventually be called the Southern Athletic Association.

Despite the departures, the SCAC intended to remain a viable entity, enlisting other schools willing to subscribe to the conference charter. Commissioner Dwayne Hanberry remained with the conference to oversee that effort, which was complicated by the paucity of unaffiliated Division III schools in the SCAC's new region of Texas and Colorado. Reflecting that challenge, the conference sought new members from the American Southwest Conference (ASC), whose geographical footprint is similar to that of the "new" SCAC.

On September 28, 2011, Centenary College of Louisiana, which had used the ASC as its original partner in its transition from Division I to Division III, announced it would join the SCAC beginning in the 2012–13 season. In early 2012, two ASC schools from Texas announced plans to join the SCAC for the 2013–14 season: Schreiner University on January 23, followed by Texas Lutheran University on February 16.

=== Landmark Conference ===
On April 2, 2013, Elizabethtown College, located in Elizabethtown, Pennsylvania, announced that it had accepted membership in the Landmark Conference, with the effective move date of July 1, 2014. The college's move to the new league ended Elizabethtown's 63-year affiliation with the Middle Atlantic Conference, and more specifically the Commonwealth Conference since 1999 when the MAC split into both the Commonwealth and Freedom Conferences.

=== Skyline Conference ===
In late April, the Skyline Conference announced that it would be adding its 11th full-time member as Sarah Lawrence College accepted an invitation to join the league based primarily in the New York City area. The school, located in Yonkers, N.Y., had previously competed in the Hudson Valley Men's and Women's Athletic Conferences and would change leagues following the 2013–14 season.

=== Heartland Collegiate Athletic Conference ===
Earlham College became a member of the Heartland Collegiate Athletic Conference in 2010 after previously being a member of the North Coast Athletic Conference.

== Ice hockey ==
=== Men's ice hockey ===
Additionally, Division I men's ice hockey underwent major realignment with the Big Ten beginning sponsorship of men's hockey, the formation of the National Collegiate Hockey Conference, and the demise of the original Central Collegiate Hockey Association. Every men's hockey conference, with the exception of the ECAC, was ultimately affected.

Division I men's ice hockey traditionally maintained a structure of hockey-only conferences with no relationship to the other major, all-sports conferences. At the start of the realignment cycle, only 60 schools participated in men's ice hockey, with most concentrated in the Midwest, New York, and New England.

However, the decision by Penn State to add varsity men's ice hockey starting in 2012, triggered by multibillionaire professional sports investor (and Penn State alumnus) Terry Pegula's financing of a new hockey arena for the university, triggered a series of changes in the conference alignment. Most significantly, the number of Big Ten universities with men's ice hockey programs reached six, the minimum number of teams required for the Big Ten to officially sponsor a sport, and more significantly the number needed by a conference to receive an automatic bid into the NCAA hockey tournament. Thus, the Big Ten member institutions voted to add men's ice hockey as a conference-sponsored sport beginning in 2013. The decision required the five existing men's ice hockey programs from Big Ten member schools to leave their current conferences – Minnesota and Wisconsin from the Western Collegiate Hockey Association (WCHA), and Michigan, Michigan State, and Ohio State from the Central Collegiate Hockey Association (CCHA).

In response to the departures of those programs—with a total of 23 national championships among them—the members of the WCHA and CCHA feared a loss of national influence and conference strength. In an attempt to create a conference perceived as competitive with the Big Ten, five additional members of the WCHA, and one from the CCHA, decided to break away and form a new conference, the National Collegiate Hockey Conference (NCHC). The NCHC began play in the 2013–14 season.

With the departures of Denver, North Dakota, Minnesota–Duluth, Nebraska-Omaha, and Colorado College, the WCHA would have been reduced to five members (from their then-current 12), all of which were Division II universities. To avoid losing their automatic bid, the remaining members of the WCHA invited six of the seven remaining members of the CCHA to join the conference.

On July 15, 2011, the NCHC was formed with the original 6 teams Colorado College Tigers, Miami (OH) University Redhawks, North Dakota Fighting Sioux (now renamed Fighting Hawks), Denver Pioneers, Nebraska–Omaha Mavericks (now athletically branded as the Omaha Mavericks), and Minnesota–Duluth Bulldogs.

The situation finally settled out in autumn 2011, with one additional WCHA (St. Cloud State) and one additional CCHA team (Western Michigan) each joining the new NCHC and remaining CCHA members Bowling Green and Notre Dame joining the revamped WCHA and Hockey East respectively. As of May 2012, two Division I men's conferences neither gained nor lost members—Atlantic Hockey and ECAC Hockey.

In that month, media reports revealed that Hockey East was in serious talks with Connecticut (UConn) that would see the Huskies move from Atlantic Hockey to become the conference's 12th men's member. From Hockey East's perspective at the time, a 12th member would ease scheduling problems. As for UConn, the move would place the school's men's and women's teams in the same conference. However, it required a significant upgrade to the men's program, which at the time did not offer scholarships and whose on-campus arena holds less than 2,000. Reportedly, the Huskies would play home games at the XL Center in Hartford (already a part-time home for the school's men's and women's basketball teams) until hockey facilities could be upgraded. The team would also award scholarships, and UConn would also add scholarships to some women's programs due to Title IX issues. On June 21, UConn and Hockey East officially announced that the school's men's team would indeed join the conference effective with the 2014–15 season. The UConn men would only play conference home games in the XL Center, with non-conference home games remaining on campus. This left the ECAC as the only men's hockey conference whose membership remained stable.

On January 17, 2013, the WCHA admitted Alabama–Huntsville, who had been independent since 2010–11, to the league effective in the 2013–14 season.

In a postscript to realignment, the CCHA would eventually be revived in 2020 by seven of the 10 then-current members of the men's WCHA; four of the seven schools had been members in the final season of the original CCHA, while a fifth was briefly a CCHA member. The new CCHA, which recognizes the original CCHA as part of its history, started play in 2021–22.

=== Women's ice hockey ===
Women's ice hockey was almost completely unaffected by the numerous realignments involving the men's teams.

Although the Big Ten then (as now) had six full members with varsity men's hockey (Michigan, Michigan State, Minnesota, Ohio State, Penn State, Wisconsin), only four of those schools sponsor varsity women's hockey (the two Michigan schools have never sponsored the sport). As of 2023–24, no other Big Ten school has added the sport, leaving the conference two short of the number of teams needed to officially sponsor women's ice hockey and receive an automatic bid to the NCAA women's hockey championship.

In addition, the original CCHA never sponsored women's hockey in its history, and in fact had only one member school with a varsity women's team (Ohio State, a departing member whose women's team was and still is in the WCHA).

The only change to the women's conference setup was in College Hockey America, which only sponsors women's hockey. CHA lost Niagara (which dropped the sport completely) and added Penn State, Lindenwood and RIT.

In another postscript, CHA and Atlantic Hockey merged after the 2023–24 season to form Atlantic Hockey America.

== Softball ==
The realignment cycle had a significant effect on softball, leading to the demise of the single-sport Pacific Coast Softball Conference (PCSC) after the 2013 season. The conference, founded in 2002 with six members, had doubled in size to 12 in 2008. However, it lost all of its membership in two waves, each corresponding with the expansion of an all-sports conference which allowed that league to sponsor softball.

The first wave was due to Big Sky expansion. At the start of the realignment cycle, five Big Sky members sponsored softball—one fewer than the six required to qualify for an automatic bid to the NCAA tournament. All five (Idaho State, Northern Colorado, Portland State, Sacramento State, and Weber State) had their softball programs in the PCSC. When North Dakota and Southern Utah, both of which sponsor softball, accepted invitations to join the Big Sky, that conference announced that it would begin softball competition in the 2013 season (2012–13 academic year). This led the five Big Sky members to withdraw from the PCSC after the 2012 season. The PCSC lost a sixth member when Seattle joined the WAC for all sports.

In the meantime, the BYU softball program entered a state of flux. Since it had just joined the WCC, which did not sponsor softball, BYU returned its softball team to its one-time all-sports home of the WAC for the 2012 season. After that season, it joined the PCSC, which was still home to the other four softball-sponsoring WCC members (Loyola Marymount, Saint Mary's, San Diego, and Santa Clara).

The second and final wave was triggered by Pacific's return to the WCC, giving that conference the six softball schools needed for an automatic NCAA bid. Accordingly, the WCC announced that it would begin sponsoring that sport in the 2014 season (2013–14 school year). The remaining two PCSC members, Cal State Bakersfield and Utah Valley, soon accepted invitations to become all-sports members of the WAC.

== Wrestling ==
On September 19, 2012, the Mid-American Conference (MAC) announced that it would add three new affiliate members in wrestling. Two of the new schools moved as a direct consequence of realignment.

The wrestling programs of both the University of Missouri and Old Dominion University were forced to find new homes as a result of their announced all-sports moves. Both moved from conferences that sponsor wrestling (respectively the Big 12 and CAA) to conferences that do not sponsor the sport (respectively the SEC and C-USA). As a result, both moved their wrestling programs into the MAC. Missouri competed only in the conference tournament in its first MAC season of 2012–13, and started conference play the following season. As Old Dominion did not leave the CAA until July 2013, it began MAC competition in 2013–14. The third new MAC affiliate was the University of Northern Iowa (UNI), moving from the Western Wrestling Conference (its all-sports conference, the Missouri Valley Conference, then as now did not sponsor wrestling). UNI's wrestling move was on the same timetable as that of Missouri—tournament participation in 2012–13 and conference play the next season.

The CAA would drop wrestling after the 2012–13 season as a result of further changes in conference membership; see the dedicated section of the CAA realignment article for more details.

== Lacrosse ==
With the 2014 addition of Rutgers and Maryland, the Big Ten would have had six women's lacrosse teams and five men's lacrosse teams. Both sports were sponsored by Ohio State, Michigan, Penn State, Rutgers and Maryland, while women's lacrosse was additionally sponsored by Northwestern. In the 2015 season (2014–15 school year), the women's teams and the men's teams (with the addition of formerly independent Johns Hopkins for men's lacrosse only) started competing as Big Ten lacrosse, leaving their former conferences (the ECAC for Ohio State and Michigan, the CAA for Penn State, the Big East for Rutgers, the ACC for Maryland, and the ALC for Northwestern).

== Membership changes ==
=== Membership change statistics ===
==== Full membership ====
Conference	Old membership total	New membership total	Net change	Members added	Members lost
America East	9	9	0	1	1
Atlantic Coast (ACC)	12	15	3	4	1
Atlantic Sun	10	8	-2	1	3
Atlantic 10	14	14	0	4	4
Big East (old, renamed The American)	16	11	-5	8	13
Big East (new)	0	10	10	10	0
Big Sky	9	12	3	3	0
Big South	11	11	0	1	1
Big Ten	11	14	3	3	0
Big 12	12	10	-2	2	4
Big West	9	9	0	1	1
Colonial (CAA)	12	10	-2	2	4
Conference USA	12	14	2	9	7
Great West	7	1	-6	0	6
Horizon	10	9	-1	1	2
Missouri Valley	10	10	0	1	1
MAAC	10	11	1	2	1
Mountain West	9	11	2	5	3
Northeast	12	10	-2	0	2
Ohio Valley	11	12	1	1	0
Pac-12 (formerly Pac-10)	10	12	2	2	0
Patriot	8	10	2	2	0
Southern (SoCon)	12	10	-2	3	5
Southeastern (SEC)	12	14	2	2	0
Southland	12	14	2	5	3
Sun Belt	12	11	-1	5	6
The Summit	10	8	-2	2	4
West Coast	8	10	2	2	0
Western (WAC)	9	8	-1	11	12

==== Football ====
The following table is reflective of both football-only membership changes and full membership changes that include football.

Conference	Subdivision	Old membership total	New membership total	Net change	Members added	Members lost
Atlantic Coast (ACC)	FBS	12	14	2	3	1
Big East (old), renamed The American)	FBS	8	12	4	9	5
Big Sky	FCS	9	13	4	4	0
Big South	FCS	7	7	0	1	1
Big Ten	FBS	11	14	3	3	0
Big 12	FBS	12	10	-2	2	4
CAA Football	FCS	12	12	0	3	3
Conference USA	FBS	12	14	2	9	7
Great West	FCS	5	0	-5	0	5
Mid-American (MAC)	FBS	13	13	0	1	1
Missouri Valley	FCS	9	10	1	1	0
Mountain West	FBS	9	12	3	6	3
Northeast	FCS	9	7	-2	0	2
Pac-12 (formerly Pac-10)	FBS	10	12	2	2	0
Pioneer	FCS	10	12	2	2	0
Southern (SoCon)	FCS	9	6	-3	0	3
Southeastern (SEC)	FBS	12	14	2	2	0
Southland	FCS	9	12	3	4	1
Sun Belt	FBS	9	11	2	7	5
Western (WAC)	FBS	9	0	-9	2	11

==== Ice hockey ====
Conference	Old membership total	New membership total	Net change	Members added	Members lost
Atlantic Hockey (men only)	12	11	−1	0	1
Big Ten (men only)	0	6	6	6	0
CCHA (men only)	11	0	−11	0	11
CHA (women only)	4	6	2	3	1
Hockey East (men)	10	12	2	2	0
NCHC (men only)	0	8	8	8	0
WCHA (men)	12	10	−2	6	8

== See also ==
- NCAA Division I conference realignment
- 2021–2026 NCAA conference realignment
- 2005 NCAA conference realignment
- 1996 NCAA conference realignment
