= 2010–2013 Western Athletic Conference realignment =

The 2010–13 Western Athletic Conference realignment refers to the Western Athletic Conference (WAC), known since July 2026 as the United Athletic Conference, dealing with several proposed and actual conference expansion and reduction plans among various NCAA conferences and institutions from 2010 to 2013. Moves involving the WAC were a significant part of a much larger NCAA conference realignment in which it was one of the most impacted conferences. Of the nine members of the WAC in 2010, only two—the University of Idaho and New Mexico State University—remained in the conference beyond the 2012–13 school year, and Idaho departed for the Big Sky Conference after the 2013–14 school year. Five pre-2010 members are now all-sports members of the Mountain West Conference (MW), and another joined the MW for football only while placing most of its other sports in the Big West Conference. Another pre-2010 member joined Conference USA (C-USA) in July 2013.

After the first defections from the conference were announced in 2010 and 2011, the WAC attempted to reload by bringing in five new members for 2012, but four of these soon announced moves to other conferences that took effect in 2013, with Seattle University being the only 2012 entrant to remain in the WAC beyond the 2012–13 school year. The WAC added six new members in 2013.

These moves resulted in the WAC dropping football as a league-sponsored sport after the 2012 season; it became the first NCAA Division I FBS conference to drop the sport since the Big West did the same after the 2000 season. The only two remaining football schools, Idaho and New Mexico State, became independent programs for the 2013 season and returned to football-only membership in the Sun Belt Conference starting in 2014 (both had been either all-sports or football members of the Sun Belt in the early 2000s).

Nearly a decade later, the WAC reinstated football, resuming play in 2021. However, this league does not play in FBS, but rather in the second tier of Division I football, the Football Championship Subdivision. Also, for the 2021 season, the FCS version of the WAC was a partnership with the ASUN Conference, a non-football conference that announced plans to launch its own FCS football league in 2022. Additionally, during the 2020s conference realignment that coincided with the WAC reinstating football, UT Arlington, which had been a WAC member in the 2012–13 school year, announced its return to the conference effective July 1, 2022.

== Background ==
The WAC was founded in 1962 by six schools in the interior West, five public and one private—the University of Arizona, Arizona State University, Brigham Young University (BYU), the University of New Mexico, the University of Utah, and the University of Wyoming. The creation of the WAC directly led to the demise of the Border Intercollegiate Athletic Association (or Border Conference) and Mountain States Conference (popularly known as the Skyline Eight), and soon led to the creation of the Big Sky Conference in 1963.

The conference added two more schools later in the 1960s, with Colorado State University and the University of Texas at El Paso (UTEP) arriving in 1967. The WAC's competitive balance, especially in football, became heavily skewed in the 1970s toward the Arizona schools due to rapid growth in that state, and they would leave in 1978 to expand the Pacific-8 Conference into the Pacific-10. San Diego State University joined at the time the two Arizona schools left; the University of Hawaiʻi at Mānoa (Hawaiʻi or UH) joined the following year, and the United States Air Force Academy (Air Force) arrived in 1980. The conference then remained stable for more than a decade, with the next change being the addition of California State University, Fresno (Fresno State) in 1992.

In 1996, the demise of the Southwest Conference (SWC) led to a major conference realignment. The WAC took advantage of the changing landscape to expand to 16 members. Three SWC members left out of the soon-to-launch Big 12 Conference—Rice University, Southern Methodist University (SMU), and Texas Christian University (TCU)—all joined the WAC, as did San Jose State University and the University of Nevada, Las Vegas (UNLV) from the Big West, plus the University of Tulsa, a Division I-A football independent which had been a member of the non-football Missouri Valley Conference. However, CBSSports.com writer Matt Hinton would say in 2012 that the expansion "quickly divided the league between old members and new." The league now spanned from Hawaii to Oklahoma—a distance of about 3,900 miles (6,300 km) and four time zones. Originally, the league was divided into four "quads" with four members each, but this setup soon proved unsatisfactory to several members, most notably BYU and Utah, who proposed a permanent split into eight-team divisions in 1998. This proposal created further problems, because the geographic distribution of the 16 members meant that a clean north-south or east-west split was impossible. While New Mexico and UTEP agreed to move to a proposed East Division, Air Force and UNLV were unhappy; Karl Benson, who was WAC commissioner during this period, recalled in 2011 that Air Force threatened to go independent. Soon, the presidents of Air Force, BYU, Colorado State, Utah, and Wyoming, a group that Benson would later call the "Gang of Five", met at Denver International Airport and quickly decided to form a new league. They invited New Mexico, San Diego State, and UNLV to join them to form what would become the Mountain West Conference, which launched in 1999.

After this upheaval, the WAC saw further movement in the 2000s. In 2000, the University of Nevada, Reno (Nevada) joined from the Big West. A year later, the Big West dropped football. While four schools from that conference, all within the WAC's geographic footprint, wanted to continue in football, only Boise State University was invited at that time. Louisiana Tech University, a Division I-A independent and otherwise a member of the Sun Belt Conference, also joined in 2001, while TCU left for C-USA. The WAC saw further membership turnover in 2005. Rice, SMU, Tulsa, and UTEP left for C-USA, while the three former Big West football schools that had been left out of the 2001 expansion—Idaho, New Mexico State, and Utah State University—all joined.

The early-2010s realignment cycle began in 2010, after both the Big Ten Conference and Pacific-10 Conference (now Pac-12) announced plans to expand to 12 members. Brett McMurphy, then of CBSSports.com, would sum up the fallout in 2012:

It was [Big Ten commissioner] Jim Delany's cow in a Chicago barn that kicked over the lantern that started the country's conference realignment inferno. After that it was a hundred reactionary moves from other conference commissioners, shoring up their ranks, while scorching college football's landscape. The other 10 [FBS] conferences may have had some hardships, but they will all survive. It's the WAC that got burned to a crisp.

== Timeline ==
Locations of WAC full members from 2005 through 2011

During the week of June 7, 2010, amid rumors surrounding Boise State's future in the WAC, the conference held a meeting of its athletic directors and university presidents in Las Vegas to discuss contingency options. The conference fully expected to lose Boise State, and according to WAC commissioner Karl Benson, there was no bitterness toward BSU by the rest of the current membership. Benson also added that the WAC was considering expanding itself, with the conference eyeing up to six current members of the second-tier Football Championship Subdivision.

Boise State left the WAC for the Mountain West at the end of the 2010–2011 season. On August 18, 2010, Nevada (Reno) and Fresno State were both extended invitations to join the Mountain West Conference, and subsequently accepted.

Four months later, Hawaiʻi also left for the Mountain West, but as a football-only member. Hawaiʻi's other sports joined the Big West. The most dominant football member of the remaining WAC had been considering football independence. With a guaranteed bowl berth into the Hawaiʻi Bowl each year, the Warriors could have negotiated their own TV deal and kept all of the profits. An NCAA rule that allows any team willing to travel to Hawaiʻi to play a 13th regular-season game (which, in practice, means an extra home game) makes it easier for the Warriors to schedule other opponents.

Utah State turned down an offer from the Mountain West at the same time that Fresno State and Nevada accepted theirs, believing that the WAC schools were going to stay together and even be stronger with the possible addition of BYU. After Fresno State and Nevada accepted invitations to the Mountain West it was reported that the WAC had extended invitations to the University of North Texas and University of Louisiana at Lafayette of the Sun Belt Conference. Both schools however declined the invitations to the WAC.

On September 28, 2010, the WAC heard presentations from five schools in an effort to replenish their ranks after Boise State, Fresno State, and Nevada leave for the Mountain West. The schools that made presentations were:

- Three schools with FCS football programs—Texas State University–San Marcos (which has since dropped "San Marcos" from its institutional name), a full member of the Southland Conference; the University of Texas at San Antonio (UTSA), a non-football member of the Southland Conference that was originally scheduled to start FCS football in that conference in 2011; and the University of Montana from the Big Sky Conference. All three were being considered as football members.
- Two schools that do not sponsor varsity football—Seattle University, a Division I independent, and the University of Denver from the Sun Belt Conference.

The WAC stated at the time that they planned to issue invitations within 30 to 60 days of hearing the presentation. On November 11, the WAC announced that Denver, UTSA, and Texas State would join the WAC for the 2012–13 season for all sports (with the exception of Denver, which does not sponsor varsity football).

During a September interview with WAC commissioner Karl Benson the only school invited to a private meeting for possible expansion of teams was Montana. However, on November 11, Montana decided to remain a Football Championship Subdivision school in the Big Sky Conference.

On June 14, 2011, the WAC added Division I independent Seattle University, who had been seeking membership to the WCC in the past. Exactly one month later on July 14, the WAC added UT Arlington from the Southland Conference.

Locations of WAC full members during the 2012-13 school year

On December 7, 2011, Boise State announced it would return its non-football sports to the WAC in 2013 when it begins playing football with the Big East. Later, Boise State chose to instead place their non-football sports in the Big West Conference, and still later due to further membership changes in the Big East, Boise State decided to stay in the Mountain West.

This would have put the WAC at 11 full members, seven football and two non-football (Seattle, Denver, UT Arlington, and Boise State), one football team short of the eight required for FBS conferences.

However, in the last days of April 2012, multiple media outlets indicated that six teams—three of which had not yet officially joined the conference—would shortly leave the WAC for other conferences. UTSA, which had yet to join the WAC, declared its intent to join Conference USA in 2013, with Louisiana Tech seen as likely to follow suit. Utah State and San Jose State declared their intent to join the Mountain West Conference in 2013. Another report indicated that Texas State and UT-Arlington, which were set to join the WAC alongside UTSA in 2012, would leave for the Sun Belt Conference effective in 2013. This would leave the WAC with only 5 full members, 2 football and 3 non-football.

The first of these schools to make its departure official was Texas State, which announced its move to the Sun Belt on May 2. Two days later, Louisiana Tech and UTSA accepted invitations from C-USA, and San Jose State and Utah State announced their departure for the Mountain West.

Due to the Western Athletic Conference being "raided" by the Mountain West Conference, Conference USA, and the Sun Belt Conference, it was initially unknown what path the WAC would take. After these moves, the WAC was down to only two football programs for the 2013 season – New Mexico State University and the University of Idaho. Since the WAC was not able to sponsor football for the 2013 season (eight teams are needed for a conference to sponsor football at the FBS level); NMSU and Idaho became FBS independents for the 2013 season before becoming football-only members of the Sun Belt in 2014.

Locations of current WAC full members

The WAC seemingly secured its continued existence as a non-football conference, at least for the time being, when it announced on October 9, 2012, that California State University, Bakersfield and Utah Valley University would join the conference starting with the 2013–14 school year. Cal State Bakersfield had previously been independent, and had become a WAC affiliate in baseball for 2012–13. Utah Valley joins from the Great West Conference. Interim WAC commissioner Jeff Hurd added that the WAC was seeking to add further schools, with an immediate goal of eight members and a longer-term goal of 10. However, Hurd's job became more difficult on October 19 when Idaho announced it would move its non-football sports to the Big Sky Conference in July 2014. In addition, Denver announced it was joining The Summit League in 2013. The WAC countered this move with inviting Division II Grand Canyon University to join the conference, who accepted. The conference added another member from the disintegrating Great West on December 5, announcing the 2013 arrival of Chicago State University. An invitation was also extended to the Great West's University of Texas–Pan American, which was accepted on December 19.

By adding these last Great West Conference schools the WAC was able to return to seven schools, which under current NCAA rules a Division I conference that drops below seven members must do within two years to avoid losing its automatic bids to the NCAA men's and women's basketball tournaments. Then, on February 7, 2013, the University of Missouri–Kansas City announced that it had accepted an invitation to join the WAC, bringing the membership to nine for 2013-14 and eight after Idaho's departure.

== Membership changes ==
School	Sport(s)	Former conference	New conference	Date move was announced	Expected year move takes effect
Boise State Broncos	Full membership	WAC	Mountain West	June 11, 2010	2011
Fresno State Bulldogs	Full membership	WAC	Mountain West	August 18, 2010	2012
Nevada Wolf Pack	Full membership	WAC	Mountain West	August 18, 2010	2012
UTSA Roadrunners	Full membership	Southland	WAC	November 10, 2010	2012
Texas State Bobcats	Full membership	Southland	WAC	November 10, 2010	2012
Denver Pioneers	Full membership (non-football)	Sun Belt	WAC	November 10, 2010	2012
Hawaiʻi (Rainbow) Warriors and Rainbow Wahine	Full membership (non-football)	WAC	Big West	December 10, 2010	2012
Hawaiʻi Warriors	Football	WAC	Mountain West	December 10, 2010	2012
Hawaiʻi Rainbow Wahine	Women's indoor track and field, women's swimming and diving	WAC	MPSF	December 10, 2010	2012
Hawaiʻi Rainbow Warriors	Men's swimming and diving	WAC	MPSF	December 10, 2010	2012
BYU Cougars	Softball	Mountain West	WAC	January 27, 2011	2012
Seattle Redhawks	Full membership (non-football)	Independent	WAC	June 14, 2011	2012
Seattle Redhawks	Softball	PCSC	WAC	June 14, 2011	2012
Seattle Redhawks	Women's golf	WCC	WAC	June 14, 2011	2012
North Dakota Fighting Sioux	Women's swimming and diving	Great West	WAC	June 15, 2011	2012
Boise State Broncos	Women's gymnastics	WAC	Independent	July 1, 2011	2011
UT Arlington Mavericks	Full membership (non-football)	Southland	WAC	July 14, 2011	2012
CSU Bakersfield Roadrunners	Baseball	Independent	WAC	September 19, 2011	2012
Dallas Baptist Patriots	Baseball	Independent	WAC	September 19, 2011	2012
BYU Cougars	Softball	WAC	PCSC	December 12, 2011	2012
Texas State Bobcats	Full membership	WAC	Sun Belt	May 2, 2012	2013
Louisiana Tech Bulldogs and Lady Techsters	Full membership	WAC	C-USA	May 4, 2012	2013
San Jose State Spartans	Full membership	WAC	Mountain West	May 4, 2012	2013
Utah State Aggies	Full membership	WAC	Mountain West	May 4, 2012	2013
UTSA Roadrunners	Full membership	WAC	C-USA	May 4, 2012	2013
UT Arlington Mavericks	Full membership (non-football)	WAC	Sun Belt	May 24, 2012	2013
Boise State Broncos	Women's gymnastics	Independent	WAC	June 14, 2012	2012
Dallas Baptist Patriots	Baseball	WAC	MVC	August 20, 2012	2013
New Mexico State Aggies	Football	WAC	Independent	September 12, 2012	2013
CSU Bakersfield Roadrunners	Full membership	Independent	WAC	October 9, 2012	2013
CSU Bakersfield Roadrunners	Men's and women's outdoor track & field, women's tennis	Great West	WAC	October 9, 2012	2013
CSU Bakersfield Roadrunners	Softball	PCSC	WAC	October 9, 2012	2013
Utah Valley Wolverines	Full membership (non-wrestling)	Great West	WAC	October 9, 2012	2013
Utah Valley Wolverines	Softball	PCSC	WAC	October 9, 2012	2013
Idaho Vandals	Football	WAC	Independent	October 19, 2012	2013
Idaho Vandals	Full membership (non-football)	WAC	Big Sky	October 19, 2012	2014
Denver Pioneers	Full membership (non-football; except gymnastics, hockey, men's and women's lacrosse, and skiing)	WAC	The Summit	November 27, 2012	2013
Grand Canyon Antelopes	Full membership	PacWest (D-II)	WAC	November 27, 2012	2013
Chicago State Cougars	Full membership	Great West	WAC	December 5, 2012	2013
Northern Colorado Bears	Baseball	Great West	WAC	December 12, 2012	2013
Texas–Pan American Broncs	Full membership	Great West	WAC	December 19, 2012	2013
Air Force Falcons	Men's soccer	MPSF	WAC	January 9, 2013	2013
CSU Bakersfield Roadrunners	Men's soccer	MPSF	WAC	January 9, 2013	2013
Houston Baptist Huskies	Men's soccer	MPSF	WAC	January 9, 2013	2013
San Jose State Spartans	Men's soccer	MPSF	WAC	January 9, 2013	2013
Seattle Redhawks	Men's soccer	MPSF	WAC	January 9, 2013	2013
UNLV Rebels	Men's soccer	MPSF	WAC	January 9, 2013	2013
UMKC Kangaroos	Full membership	The Summit	WAC	February 7, 2013	2013
North Dakota athletics	Baseball	Great West	WAC	February 11, 2013	2013

== See also ==
- NCAA conference realignment
- 2021–2024 NCAA conference realignment
- 2005 NCAA conference realignment
- 1996 NCAA conference realignment
