= 2010–2013 Colonial Athletic Association realignment =

Multiyear realignment of a college athletic conference

The 2010–2013 Colonial Athletic Association realignment refers to the Colonial Athletic Association (CAA), renamed in 2023 to the Coastal Athletic Association, and Colonial Athletic Association Football Conference (branded as CAA Football) dealing with several proposed and actual conference expansion and reduction plans among various NCAA conferences and institutions from 2010 to 2013. Some moves affected only the all-sports CAA; others affected only CAA Football; and still others affected both sides of the CAA. Moves that involved the overall CAA were part of a much larger NCAA conference realignment.

Among the fallout from the moves in the CAA was that the conference dropped wrestling as a sponsored sport after the 2012–13 school year. The 2013 departures of all-sports members Old Dominion and George Mason left the CAA with too few schools to sponsor the sport, and all of its remaining wrestling schools would join other conferences for that sport.

== Timeline ==
=== UMass football moves to FBS ===
The first move in the 2010–13 time frame affecting the CAA involved the University of Massachusetts Amherst (UMass) football team. At the start of the realignment cycle, UMass was a member of CAA Football, an associate member of the all-sports CAA in men's lacrosse, and a full member of the non-football Atlantic 10 Conference (A-10).

For nearly 20 years, UMass had intermittently considered moving its football program from the second-tier Division I FCS to the top-level Division I FBS (the subdivisions were respectively known as Divisions I-AA and I-A before 2006). The issue of an FBS move became more pressing to the UMass administration in the late 2000s due to significant changes in the CAA. Two members of both sides of the CAA and natural football rivals for UMass, Northeastern (located in Boston) and Hofstra (on Long Island), dropped football after the 2009 season. Another New England school with membership only in CAA Football, Rhode Island, was soon to announce that it would leave CAA Football for the Northeast Conference in the near future. In addition, Villlanova, a longtime member of the Big East Conference but a CAA Football member, had long been rumored to be contemplating a move to Big East football. According to UMass athletic director James McCutcheon, these changes would have greatly impacted UMass football had it stayed in CAA Football—most significantly in increased travel costs due to CAA Football apparently becoming a more Southern-based league.

Accordingly, UMass announced on April 20, 2011 that it would transition to FBS beginning that fall, and would become a football-only member of the Mid-American Conference (MAC) at that time. Because its on-campus football stadium, Warren McGuirk Alumni Stadium, did not meet FBS standards, the school also announced that it would play all of its 2012 and 2013 home games, plus at least four home games in each season from 2014 to 2016, at Gillette Stadium in Foxborough, Massachusetts, home to the NFL's New England Patriots and the New England Revolution of Major League Soccer. Although Gillette Stadium is nearly 100 miles (160 km) from the Amherst campus, it is within a half-hour drive of about 120,000 UMass alumni. In addition, UMass negotiated a deal with the stadium that gave the school a relatively low share of gameday revenue but limited its potential financial risk, and also allowed it to delay the possibility of having to build and finance a completely new stadium. McGuirk Stadium was then renovated to FBS standards, with essentially no increase in capacity.

=== Departure of Georgia State ===
After the departure of UMass football, realignment activity passed the CAA by for nearly a year. In February 2012, Georgia State University, which had only begun a football program two years earlier, announced that it had commissioned a study to determine the feasibility of an FBS upgrade. The study, obtained later that month by the Atlanta Journal-Constitution through an open records request, concluded that the school was well placed for an upgrade, citing the university's location in the top-10 media market of Atlanta and its enrollment of over 30,000—although the report admitted that a large majority of GSU's athletic budget came from student fees. Significantly, the report stated that the best fit for GSU would be the Sun Belt Conference—whose then-incoming commissioner Karl Benson had named conference expansion as one of his leading priorities. Also of note is that GSU had been a charter member of the Sun Belt in 1976, but left that conference in 1981.

The rumored return to the Sun Belt became official on April 9 at a press conference at the Georgia Dome, then GSU's football home. The Panthers would return to full Sun Belt membership on July 1, 2013; the football team would start its FBS transition with the 2012 season, begin playing a full Sun Belt schedule in 2013, and become a full FBS member in 2014.

=== Departures of VCU and Old Dominion ===
Shortly after Georgia State announced its departure for the Sun Belt Conference, the CAA again became a target for conferences seeking to expand.

In March 2012, the A-10 suffered a significant blow when conference mainstay Temple University announced its departure for the Big East Conference, with the school's FBS football team moving from the MAC that fall and its other sports joining the conference in July 2013 (by which time the Big East had split into two conferences, with Temple joining the football-sponsoring portion now known as the American Athletic Conference). Since the A-10 does not sponsor football, it began membership discussions with three basketball-focused schools—Butler University, then of the Horizon League; and two CAA members, George Mason University and Virginia Commonwealth University (VCU).

In the meantime, Conference USA (C-USA) was reeling from the loss of four members to the Big East, with Houston, Memphis, SMU, and UCF all having announced in the preceding months that they would join the Big East in 2013. In an attempt to replenish the league's numbers, C-USA entered into membership talks with several schools, with one of them being CAA member Old Dominion University. Although Old Dominion had only established its football program in 2009, that program had been highly successful, going 27–8 in its first three seasons and advancing to the second round of the 2011 FCS playoffs. Old Dominion, located in Norfolk, Virginia, also provided access to a significant media market in Hampton Roads.

Of the CAA schools involved in this phase of realignment, the first to announce its departure was VCU, doing so on May 15. While it had initially planned to join the A-10 for the 2013–14 school year, it ended up joining for the 2012–13 school year. One reason for the immediate move was that under CAA bylaws, a school that announces its departure becomes immediately ineligible for conference championships in team sports—most significantly the men's basketball tournament. (Note: This issue would play a significant role in the early-2020s realignment, specifically leading the Sun Belt Conference to expedite the addition of James Madison, previously a member of both sides of the CAA, from the originally intended date of July 2023 to July 2022.) VCU's move to the A10 was also a substantial upgrade in basketball competition. The CAA had never received an at-large bid to the NCAA men's basketball tournament until George Mason made the 2006 tournament and went on a surprise Final Four run. Only three other CAA teams received at-large bids from 2007 to 2012, with one of them being the 2011 VCU team that made its own surprise Final Four run. By comparison, the A-10 had received 20 at-large bids from 2000 to 2012. The move also united VCU with cross-city rival Richmond.

Two days later, Old Dominion announced it would join C-USA in July 2013, and begin an FBS upgrade at that time. Under the original plan, ODU would not become a football member of C-USA until it became a full FBS member in 2015. C-USA later voted to make Old Dominion eligible for the conference football championship in 2014; in that season, ODU was counted as an FBS member for scheduling purposes but was not eligible for a bowl game (full FBS membership and bowl eligibility followed in 2015). Old Dominion got a head start on its future C-USA membership, moving five of its spring sports—men's and women's golf, men's and women's tennis, and women's rowing—from the CAA to C-USA for the 2012–13 school year.

Due to this move, ODU had to find new homes for three of its sports that C-USA does not sponsor. The wrestling team was the first to find a new affiliation, being announced on September 19, 2012 as an associate of the MAC effective in 2013–14. The field hockey team then announced in December 2012 that it would become a member of the original Big East in 2013. However, the team was temporarily left in limbo due to the conference's upcoming split into the football-sponsoring American Athletic Conference (The American) and a new, non-football Big East, which would have led to neither conference having enough field hockey schools to qualify for an automatic NCAA tournament bid. This situation was resolved in May 2013, when the two leagues agreed that only the new Big East would sponsor that sport, with the field hockey schools from The American (including Old Dominion) becoming associate members. Finally, the women's lacrosse team announced on June 29 that it was joining the Atlantic Sun Conference, now known as the ASUN Conference, in 2014 (2015 lacrosse season) after a transitional year as an independent.

=== Albany and Stony Brook join for football ===
After the losses of Georgia State, Old Dominion, and VCU, the CAA initially decided to reload with football in mind. On August 7, 2012, the conference announced that it would add Albany and Stony Brook as CAA Football members in 2013. At the time of the announcement, both schools were full members of the America East with associate football memberships elsewhere—Albany in the Northeast Conference (NEC) and Stony Brook in the Big South Conference. Both remained America East members.

According to media reports, the CAA targeted the two schools for their location in the Northeast (maintaining geographic balance in the football conference) and their steady improvement in football in recent years. The two teams had played each other in the first round of the 2011 FCS playoffs, with Stony Brook winning.

The move was a significant upgrade for both football programs. At that time, Albany's football home of the NEC capped football scholarships at the equivalent of 38 full scholarships, while CAA Football allows the FCS maximum of 63. The school was building a new 8,000-seat stadium, which had been viewed by local media as an attempt to gain football relevancy. As for Stony Brook, then-athletic director Jim Fiore said after the announcement, "We want to compete for a national championship in football." Before its 2023 football merger with the Ohio Valley Conference, the Big South was generally a one-bid league in the FCS playoffs, unlike CAA Football, which then (as now) routinely sent multiple teams.

Notably in a realignment cycle marked by secrecy and intrigue, CAA commissioner Tom Yeager opted for transparency, keeping his counterparts in the NEC and Big South informed throughout the process. In addition, Yeager asked Rhode Island to reconsider its November 2010 decision to leave CAA Football for the NEC in 2013. On August 28, Rhode Island announced that it would remain in CAA Football.

In a postscript, Stony Brook became a member of the all-sports CAA in 2022 after nearly a decade in CAA Football.

=== Women's rowing: Enter Eastern Michigan, exit Boston University ===
In the meantime, the CAA welcomed a new associate member for women's rowing in Eastern Michigan University. The Eagles, a full MAC member which had competed as an independent in that sport since establishing a rowing program in 2001, were announced as a rowing affiliate on October 9, 2012, effective immediately. EMU would effectively replace another associate member, Boston University, in the CAA women's rowing league; four months earlier, the Terriers announced that they would move their entire athletic program to the rowing-sponsoring Patriot League in July 2013.

=== Charleston joins ===
The CAA also worked on shoring up its basketball side; as rumored several months earlier, it courted the College of Charleston and Davidson College from the Southern Conference (SoCon). At the time, Charleston did not have a football program, while Davidson operated a non-scholarship FCS program in the Pioneer Football League (as of 2026, neither school has changed its football status). In October 2012, the CAA formally invited both schools to join in July 2013. On October 17, Davidson turned down the CAA invitation. Charleston opted to accept; the school's board of trustees voted 12–5 in favor on October 19, and authorized the school's president to enter into final contract negotiations with the CAA. Charleston's arrival in the conference was officially announced on November 30.

Jeff Eisenberg of Yahoo Sports speculated that both schools made correct decisions for their individual situations, noting that "Davidson had more to lose by leaving the SoCon than Charleston because the Wildcats have the greater recent [men's basketball] history in the league." From 2002 through 2012, Davidson won at least a share of its SoCon division eight times and made five NCAA tournaments. In the same period, Charleston won its SoCon division four times, but made no NCAA appearances. During that time, the CAA had not regularly sent multiple teams to the NCAA tournament, but its schools typically earned higher seeds than SoCon schools. However, the departure of VCU and then-impending exit of Old Dominion robbed the CAA of two of its strongest basketball programs, making that conference a risky proposition for schools such as Charleston and Davidson—though apparently more so for Davidson because of its considerably greater recent SoCon success.

A report by Matt Norlander, then of CBSSports.com, which cited an unnamed source with close ties to Davidson, shed light on that school's thinking. According to the source, Davidson was committed to the SoCon because the conference fit with the school's mission statement, and Davidson valued a comfortable conference fit much more highly than the potential of higher paychecks in a league less amenable to its mission. Eisenberg also noted that the CAA's basketball footprint extended far into the Northeast with Drexel and Northeastern, making travel costs a concern for Southeastern-based schools such as Davidson and Charleston. Davidson would eventually receive an offer from the A-10 in 2013, officially joining that conference in 2014.

=== Departure of George Mason ===
Although George Mason did not receive an invitation from the A-10 in 2012, it was not the end of that school's involvement in realignment. Mason once again became an A-10 candidate in 2013, and as in 2012, the process was set into motion by developments in the Big East Conference.

In December 2012, the seven non-FBS members of the Big East, a group that would soon be called the "Catholic 7" (from the shared religious affiliation of the group), announced they would leave the conference as a unit no later than 2015. In March 2013, the Big East and "Catholic 7" came to a separation agreement, under which the "Catholic 7" would leave the conference effective July 1, purchase the "Big East" name, and reorganize as a new Big East Conference.

With the new Big East wishing to expand to anywhere from 10 to 12 schools, media speculation on expansion candidates immediately focused on four A-10 members that fit the new conference's profile of urban, private, basketball-focused schools without FBS football—Butler (which had only joined the A10 in July 2012), Dayton, Richmond, and Xavier. Later in March, the new Big East was unveiled, with the "Catholic 7" joined by Creighton from the Missouri Valley Conference, plus Butler and Xavier from the A-10.

In response to the A-10 preparing to lose four schools in July 2013—the aforementioned Temple, Butler, and Xavier, plus Charlotte (to C-USA)— the conference once again entered into talks with Mason. On March 25, George Mason announced that it would become an A-10 member effective July 1. Mason's move reunited the school with longtime CAA rival VCU, and also created a new local rivalry with George Washington (located in Washington, D.C., with Mason in nearby Fairfax, Virginia).

=== The end of CAA wrestling ===
The various moves in the CAA eventually led to the conference dropping the sport after the 2012–13 school year.

The first move involving that sport was, as previously noted, Old Dominion's (whose primary conference does not sponsor wrestling) move to associate membership in the MAC.

More attrition in the wrestling side of the league became imminent when George Mason announced its departure for the Atlantic 10, a conference that also does not sponsor the sport. Once Mason left the CAA, that would leave the conference with an unsustainable wrestling membership of five. On April 25, 2013, the death knell for CAA wrestling was sounded when four schools—wrestling affiliates Binghamton and Boston University, plus full CAA members Drexel and Hofstra—announced that they would join the Eastern Intercollegiate Wrestling Association for 2013–14, which led the CAA to announce it was dropping the sport immediately. The following month, the last two CAA wrestling schools revealed their future plans for that sport. Mason and wrestling associate Rider both announced on May 13 that they would join the Eastern Wrestling League for 2013–14.

=== Elon Joins ===
In the meantime, the Southern Conference (SoCon) was being battered by realignment, seeing four members announce their departures in a five-month time frame. This instability in the SoCon led another conference member, Elon University, to explore its options. The CAA, seeing an opportunity to shore up its southern flank, began membership talks with Elon in early April 2013.

On May 23, the CAA and Elon announced that the school would become a member of the all-sports CAA and CAA Football in July 2014, making Elon the second school (after Charleston) to announce a move from the SoCon to the CAA in the realignment cycle. Elon athletic director Dave Blank stated that the move was ultimately about what the school's administration believed was the best fit:

In our analysis, and in our decision, we were looking strictly at what was best for our institution. We had to make that decision not knowing with the Southern Conference is going to look like and not knowing what the Colonial Athletic Association is going to look like.

Elon president Leo M. Lambert also noted that more than half of the private North Carolina school's enrollment in the upcoming 2013-14 school year came from the CAA's geographic footprint.

=== Men's lacrosse: Exit Penn State, enter Fairfield ===
In April 2013, the student newspaper of Fairfield University, The Mirror, reported that the administration of the small Catholic university in Connecticut was eyeing a move from the Metro Atlantic Athletic Conference (MAAC) to another league, with the CAA rumored as a favorite. While these rumors did not prove true, with Fairfield still in the MAAC as of 2022, Fairfield did make a small move toward the CAA in June 2013.

As the end of the 2012–13 school year approached, men's lacrosse became a significant realignment topic. The first seeds of this phase of realignment were sown in November 2012, when the Big Ten Conference announced that Maryland and Rutgers would become members in 2014. With five schools on board in men's lacrosse and six in women's lacrosse, the Big Ten then announced on June 3, 2013 that it would begin sponsoring lacrosse for both men and women beginning in the 2015 lacrosse season, with Johns Hopkins as an associate member in men's lacrosse.

This move by the Big Ten was a blow for two men's lacrosse conferences in particular—the CAA and Fairfield's then-current home for men's lacrosse, ECAC Lacrosse. Those two leagues then housed the lacrosse programs of three Big Ten members, with Penn State having been a CAA associate since the 2010 season and Michigan and Ohio State playing in the ECAC. The latter conference was already set to lose Loyola (Maryland) to all-sports membership in the Patriot League and Denver to single-sport membership in the new Big East at the end of that month.

On June 18, just over two weeks after the Big Ten lacrosse announcement, Fairfield announced that it would move its men's lacrosse team to the CAA, effective with the 2015 lacrosse season. Shortly after the announcement, Fairfield athletic director Gene Doris indicated that the school had chosen the CAA over the MAAC because of the CAA's higher profile in that sport.

== Membership changes ==
School	Sport(s)	Former conference	New conference	Date move was announced	Expected year move takes effect
UMass Minutemen	Football	CAA	MAC	April 20, 2011	2012
Georgia State Panthers	Full membership	CAA	Sun Belt	April 9, 2012	2013
VCU Rams	Full membership (non-football)	CAA	Atlantic 10	May 15, 2012	2012
Old Dominion Monarchs	Full membership	CAA	C-USA	May 17, 2012	2013
Boston University Terriers	Women's rowing	CAA	Patriot League	June 15, 2012	2013
Albany Great Danes	Football	NEC	CAA	August 7, 2012	2013
Stony Brook Seawolves	Football	Big South	CAA	August 7, 2012	2013
Old Dominion Monarchs and Lady Monarchs	Men's and women's golf, men's and women's tennis, women's rowing	CAA	C-USA	September 4, 2012	2012
Old Dominion Monarchs	Wrestling	CAA	MAC	September 19, 2012	2013
Eastern Michigan Eagles	Women's rowing	Independent	CAA	October 9, 2012	2012
Charleston Cougars	Full membership	SoCon	CAA	November 30, 2012	2013
Charleston Cougars	Men's and women's swimming and diving	CCSA	CAA	November 30, 2012	2013
Old Dominion Monarchs	Field hockey	CAA	Big East	December 6, 2012	2013
George Mason Patriots	Full membership	CAA	Atlantic 10	March 25, 2013	2013
Binghamton Bearcats	Wrestling	CAA	EIWA	April 25, 2013	2013
Boston University Terriers	Wrestling	CAA	EIWA	April 25, 2013	2013
Drexel Dragons	Wrestling	CAA	EIWA	April 25, 2013	2013
Hofstra Pride	Wrestling	CAA	EIWA	April 25, 2013	2013
George Mason Patriots	Wrestling	CAA	EWL	May 13, 2013	2013
Rider Broncs	Wrestling	CAA	EWL	May 13, 2013	2013
Elon Phoenix	Full membership	SoCon	CAA	May 23, 2013	2014
Elon Phoenix	Women's lacrosse	Atlantic Sun	CAA	May 23, 2013	2014
Penn State Nittany Lions	Men's lacrosse	CAA	Big Ten	June 3, 2013	2014
Fairfield Stags	Men's lacrosse	ECAC Lacrosse	CAA	June 18, 2013	2014
Old Dominion Monarchs	Women's lacrosse	CAA	Independent	June 29, 2013	2013
Old Dominion Monarchs	Women's lacrosse	Independent	Atlantic Sun	June 29, 2013	2014

== See also ==
- NCAA Division I conference realignment
- 2021–2024 NCAA conference realignment, which also significantly impacted the CAA
- 2010–2014 NCAA conference realignment
- 2005 NCAA conference realignment
- 1996 NCAA conference realignment
