= Eastern Wrestling League =

- Association: NCAA
- Founded: 1975
- Folded: after 2019 season
- Sports fielded: Men's wrestling
- Division: Division I
- No. of teams: 7
- Region: Northeastern United States

The Eastern Wrestling League (EWL) was an NCAA Division I wrestling-only conference. It was made up mostly of schools from the northeastern United States whose primary conferences did not sponsor wrestling as an NCAA-qualifying event. The teams had traditionally rotated as hosts of the qualifying tournament.

The league's inaugural season was in 1976 (during the 1975–76 academic year) and had a charter group led by Penn State, Pittsburgh, Buffalo and three Pennsylvania State Athletic Conference (PSAC) schools in Bloomsburg, Clarion and Lock Haven. After 1977, Buffalo left the league, but West Virginia and Cleveland State were added, growing the league to seven teams. In 1988–89, the PSAC's Edinboro joined to form an eight-team league.

After the 1991–92 season, Penn State left the league when the university joined the Big Ten Conference, which holds its own NCAA Division I Championships qualifying tournament. In 1998–99, Virginia Tech joined the league, but the Hokies left following the 2003–04 season and joined the Atlantic Coast Conference (ACC) after receiving an invitation to join for all sports. West Virginia left the EWL when it became an all-sports member of the Big 12 Conference in July 2012 and Pittsburgh moved to the ACC in July 2013.

In 2013, the league announced that George Mason and Rider had accepted invitations to join the conference beginning in the 2013–14 academic year. Both schools were previously members of the Colonial Athletic Association, with George Mason being a full CAA member and Rider an associate whose primary conference (MAAC) does not sponsor wrestling. GMU left the CAA and joined the non-wrestling Atlantic 10 Conference. The departure of George Mason also led to the end of CAA sponsorship of wrestling in 2013. Four of the other EWL schools are normally members of the Division II PSAC. Cleveland State, which had announced it would drop wrestling at the end of the 2015–16 school year, but later reinstated the program without interruption, is a member of the non-wrestling Horizon League.

On March 5, 2019, the seven members of the EWL accepted affiliate membership to the Mid-American Conference starting in the 2019-2020 season.

== Schools ==
=== Final members ===
- Bloomsburg Huskies (1975–2019)
- Clarion Golden Eagles (1975–2019)
- Cleveland State Vikings (1977–2019)
- Edinboro Fighting Scots (1988–2019)
- George Mason Patriots (2013–2019)
- Lock Haven Bald Eagles (1975–2019)
- Rider Broncs (2013–2019)

=== Schools leaving before 2018–19 ===
- Buffalo Bulls (1975–1977)
- Millersville Marauders (1981–1984)
- Penn State Nittany Lions (1975–1992)
- Pittsburgh Panthers (1975–2013)
- Virginia Tech Hokies (1998–2004)
- West Virginia Mountaineers (1977–2012)

== Team dual meet champions ==
EWL Team Dual Meet Champions

- 1976 Penn State
- 1977 Penn State
- 1978 Penn State
- 1979 Cleveland State
- 1980 Clarion
- 1981 Clarion
- 1982 Penn State
- 1983 Penn State
- 1984 Penn State
- 1985 Penn State
- 1986 Penn State & Clarion
- 1987 Penn State
- 1988 Penn State
- 1989 Penn State
- 1990 West Virginia
- 1991 West Virginia
- 1992 Penn State
- 1993 Lock Haven & Bloomsburg
- 1994 Edinboro
- 1995 Lock Haven
- 1996 Edinboro
- 1997 Edinboro
- 1998 West Virginia
- 1999 Edinboro
- 2000 Edinboro
- 2001 Edinboro
- 2002 West Virginia
- 2003 West Virginia
- 2004 Edinboro
- 2005 Edinboro
- 2006 Edinboro
- 2007 Edinboro
- 2008 Edinboro
- 2009 Edinboro
- 2010 Pittsburgh
- 2011 Pittsburgh
- 2012 Pittsburgh
- 2013 Bloomsburg
- 2014 Edinboro
- 2015 Edinboro
- 2016 Edinboro
- 2017 Edinboro
- 2018 Edinboro and Rider
- 2019 Lock Haven

== Team tournament champions ==
EWL Team Tournament Champions

- 1976 Penn State
- 1977 Penn State
- 1978 Penn State
- 1979 Cleveland State
- 1980 Clarion
- 1981 Bloomsburg
- 1982 Penn State
- 1983 Penn State
- 1984 Penn State
- 1985 Penn State
- 1996 Penn State
- 1987 Penn State
- 1988 Penn State
- 1989 Penn State
- 1990 Penn State
- 1991 Penn State
- 1992 Penn State
- 1993 Bloomsburg
- 1994 Clarion
- 1995 Clarion
- 1996 West Virginia
- 1997 Lock Haven
- 1998 Edinboro
- 1999 Edinboro
- 2000 Edinboro
- 2001 Edinboro
- 2002 West Virginia
- 2003 Edinboro
- 2004 Edinboro & West Virginia
- 2005 Edinboro
- 2006 Edinboro
- 2007 Edinboro
- 2008 Edinboro
- 2009 Edinboro
- 2010 Edinboro
- 2011 Pittsburgh
- 2012 Pittsburgh
- 2013 Pittsburgh
- 2014 Edinboro
- 2015 Edinboro
- 2016 Rider
- 2017 Edinboro
- 2018 Lock Haven
- 2019 Lock Haven
