= Pacific Coast Softball Conference =

- Association: NCAA
- Founded: 2002
- Folded: 2013
- Commissioner: Ellen Moore (at dissolution)
- Sports fielded: Women's softball
- Division: Division I
- No. of teams: 6 (at formation); 12 (maximum); 7 (final)
- Region: Western United States

Locations
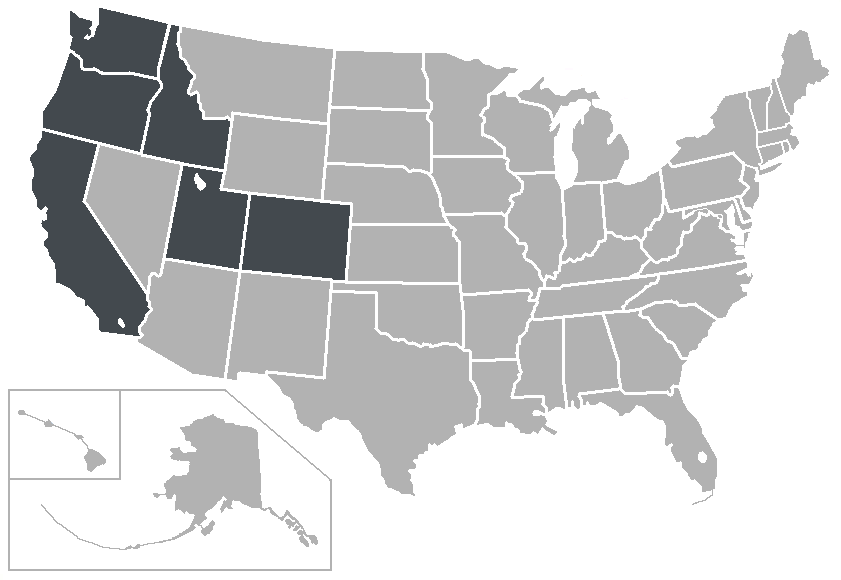

The Pacific Coast Softball Conference (PCSC) was an NCAA Division I conference that only sponsored women's softball. It was founded in 2002, beginning play in spring 2003, with six members in the Western United States. The PCSC expanded to 12 members for the 2009–10 school year, and maintained that size for three seasons, but major conference realignment first decimated the conference and then led to its demise after the 2013 softball season.

== History ==
=== Early years ===
The conference was founded in 2002 as a six-team league. Four of the charter members—Loyola Marymount University, Saint Mary's College of California, the University of San Diego, and Santa Clara University—were members of the West Coast Conference. The other two founding members, Portland State University and California State University, Sacramento (Sacramento State), were full members of the Big Sky Conference. The conference doubled in size in 2009 (2010 season), with California State University, Bakersfield (Cal State Bakersfield), Idaho State University, the University of Northern Colorado, Seattle University, Utah Valley University, and Weber State University joining.

In 2010, members were split into two divisions: Coastal and Mountain. Members of the Coastal division were Cal State Bakersfield, Loyola Marymount, Sacramento State, San Diego, Santa Clara and Saint Mary's. Members of the Mountain division were Idaho State, Northern Colorado, Portland State, Seattle, Utah Valley and Weber State. The division champions faced each other in a best-of-three series to determine the conference champion. The conference champion received an automatic bid to the NCAA Division I softball tournament. In the league's final season of 2013, after the conference dropped from 12 to 7 members, the divisional alignment was scrapped and the top team in the conference standings received the PCSC's automatic bid.

In 2007, the Loyola Marymount Lions advanced to the NCAA regional final, eventually losing to the Hawaii Rainbow Wahine.

=== Change in 2012 ===
The conference saw major change after the 2012 season, with six members leaving and one new member joining.

Five of the departed members—Idaho State, Northern Colorado, Portland State, Sacramento State, and Weber State—were full Big Sky members. With that conference adding two new softball-sponsoring schools in 2012, giving it the six softball members it needed to qualify for an automatic bid to the NCAA Division I Softball Championship, the Big Sky announced it would begin sponsoring the sport in the 2013 season. The other departing member, Seattle, was an independent before joining the Western Athletic Conference (WAC) for all sports, including softball, in 2012.

The new member was Brigham Young University (BYU). In 2011, BYU left its former all-sports league, the Mountain West Conference (which sponsors softball) for the WCC (which at the time did not sponsor the sport). After playing the 2012 season in the WAC, BYU moved its softball program to the PCSC. BYU entered the PCSC with eight straight NCAA Tournament appearances under their belts. They also won four straight conference titles (MW 2008–2011, WAC 2012).

=== Demise in 2013 ===
Further developments in conference realignment led to the demise of the PCSC after the 2013 season.

The University of the Pacific, a charter member of the WCC that departed in 1971, announced plans to rejoin the WCC in 2013. This gave that conference the six softball-sponsoring members it needed to sponsor the sport, and on September 13, 2012, the WCC announced that it would start softball competition in the 2013–14 school year.

The two remaining schools, Utah Valley and Cal State Bakersfield, had been linked with moves to the WAC as softball affiliates. However, after a massive wave of departures from that conference set for 2013 placed its future existence in doubt, the WAC invited both to join as full members beginning in 2013–14, with both accepting. Although the WAC sponsored softball, the aforementioned turnover left it with too few softball-sponsoring schools to qualify for an automatic bid to the NCAA championship. Originally both schools accepted associate membership in the WCC for softball effective in 2013–14, while also maintaining softball membership in the WAC. However the addition of Grand Canyon brought the WAC back up to the 6 teams needed to still sponsor softball, allowing Utah Valley and Cal State Bakersfield to join the WAC full-time for softball.

== Member schools ==
All former members of the PCSC became full or associate members of softball-sponsoring all-sports conferences immediately after the PCSC's demise.

Note: Because NCAA softball is a spring sport, the first season in which each member competed in the PCSC occurred in the calendar year after it joined.

Institution	Location	Founded	Affiliation	Nickname	Joined (Note: Represents the calendar year when fall sports competition begins.)	Left (Note: Represents the calendar year when spring sports competition ends.)	Primary conference while in the PCSC	Current primary conference
Brigham Young University (BYU)	Provo, Utah	1875	Private	Cougars	2012	2013	West Coast (WCC)	Big 12
California State University, Bakersfield (CSU Bakersfield or Bakersfield)	Bakersfield, California	1965	Public	Roadrunners	2009	2013	D-I Independent	Big West (BWC)
Idaho State University	Pocatello, Idaho	1901	Public	Bengals	2009	2012	Big Sky (BSC)	
Loyola Marymount University	Los Angeles, California	1865	Private	Lions	2002	2013	West Coast (WCC)	
University of Northern Colorado	Greeley, Colorado	1889	Public	Bears	2009	2012	Big Sky (BSC)	
Portland State University	Portland, Oregon	1946	Public	Vikings	2002	2012	Big Sky (BSC)	
California State University, Sacramento (Sacramento State)	Sacramento, California	1947	Public	Hornets	2002	2012	Big Sky (BSC) (Big West (BWC) in 2026)	
Saint Mary's College of California	Moraga, California	1863	Private	Gaels	2002	2013	West Coast (WCC)	
University of San Diego	San Diego, California	1949	Private	Toreros	2002	2013	West Coast (WCC)	
Santa Clara University	Santa Clara, California	1851	Private	Broncos	2002	2013	West Coast (WCC)	
Seattle University	Seattle, Washington	1891	Private	Redhawks	2009	2012	D-I Independent	West Coast (WCC)
Utah Valley University	Orem, Utah	1941	Public	Wolverines	2009	2013	Great West (GWC)	Western (WAC) (Big West (BWC) in 2026)
Weber State University	Ogden, Utah	1889	Public	Wildcats	2009	2012	Big Sky (BSC)	

== Championships ==
Year	Champion
2003	Loyola Marymount
2004	Santa Clara
2005	Loyola Marymount
2006	Portland State
2007	Loyola Marymount
2008	Sacramento State
2009	Portland State

Year	Coastal	Mountain	Overall
2010	Saint Mary's	Portland State	Saint Mary's
2011	Loyola Marymount	Portland State	Portland State
2012	Saint Mary's	Portland State	Portland State

Year	Champion
2013	BYU
