= Karl Benson =

American conference commissioner

Biographical details
- Born: December 1, 1951 (age 74); La Grande, Oregon, U.S.
- Education: Spokane Falls Community College; Boise State University (BS); University of Utah (MA)

Playing career
- 1971–1972: Spokane Falls CC
- 1973–1975: Boise State
- Position: infielder

Coaching career (HC unless noted)
- 1976–1981: Fort Steilacoom CC
- 1984–1986: Utah (assistant)

Administrative career (AD unless noted)
- 1979–1984: Fort Steilacoom CC
- 1984–1986: Utah (Administrative Assistant)
- 1986–1987: NCAA (Compliance Representative)
- 1987–1988: NCAA (Assistant Director of Championships)
- 1988–1990: NCAA (Director of Championships)
- 1990–1994: Mid-American Conference (commissioner)
- 1994–2012: Western Athletic Conference (commissioner)
- 2012–2019: Sun Belt Conference (commissioner)

Karl David Benson (born December 1, 1951) is a former college baseball coach and college athletics administrator. Benson last served as the commissioner of the Sun Belt Conference (SBC) from 2012 until his retirement in June 2019. Previously, Benson was the commissioner of the Mid-American Conference (MAC) from 1990 to 1994 and the Western Athletic Conference (WAC) from 1994 to 2012. Benson is the only person to have served as commissioner at three Division I-A/FBS athletic conferences.

== Early life and education ==
=== Early life ===
Benson was born in La Grande, Oregon, on December 1, 1951 to Leonard Benson (father): a freight agent at Consolidated Freightways and construction company co-owner and Ruth Oxford (mother): a small construction company co-owner and active member of the Lutheran church. Benson had an older brother named Michael and has two other brothers named Eric and Mark. Before high school, Benson grew up in Yakima, Spokane, and Pullman, Washington.

Benson attended and graduated from Pullman High School in 1970, and played for the high school's football, basketball, and baseball teams. Benson played first base and catcher, and earned first-team all-league honors in, both, his junior and senior seasons in 1969 and 1970. Additionally, during his senior season, Benson led the league in home runs and batted a .405 batting average.

=== College years ===
Benson spent his first two years of his undergraduate education and college baseball career at Spokane Falls Community College on scholarship and played for its baseball team as a second baseman for its 1971 and 1972 seasons. The college's head coach Bill Johnson described Benson as a "hardworking, competitive young man who accepted the role of leader and role model for his teammates". Benson was inducted into the college's Athletic Hall of Fame in 2016.

Benson then transferred to and played second base and catcher at Boise State University: where he graduated with a Bachelor of Science degree in Physical education in 1975. Benson was named its "most inspirational baseball player" at the university's all-sports banquet. During the 1974 season, Benson finished with a .306 batting average.

Benson also graduated in 1986 with a master's degree in athletics management from the University of Utah.

== Career ==
=== Early career ===
Upon graduation, Benson became the head coach of Fort Steilacoom Community College (n/k/a Pierce College) from 1976 to 1981. Benson won his 100th game as a head coach on March 9, 1982 after winning against Everett Community College in the Edmonds College Invitational baseball tournament. Benson got his first Athletic Administration job by serving as the college's athletic director from July 17, 1979 – March 9, 1984.

From 1984-1986, Benson served as, both, a coaching assistant to the Utah Utes baseball team and an administrative assistant to the Utah Utes athletics department.

In January 1986, Benson left Utah to work for the National Collegiate Athletic Association (NCAA) initially as a Compliance Representative, then promoted to assistant director of championships in June 1987 and, finally, director of championships in 1988. As assistant director of championships, Benson played a role in coordinating the NCAA Division I Men's Wrestling Championships to the Myriad Convention Center in Oklahoma City for the 1989 and 1992 seasons. As the director of championships, Benson "actively supervised eight assistant directors in their administration of 68 NCAA championships".

=== Commissioner of the Mid-American Conference (MAC) ===
On June 18, 1990, Benson became the 5th commissioner of the Mid-American Conference to replace, outgoing, Jim Lessig. During Benson's four years with the MAC, he oversaw the University of Akron becoming the 10th member of the conference in 1992. Benson also extended, for 2 years, the conference's existing sports broadcasting deal with ESPN in 1991 to televise its men's basketball championship tournament game. Benson was also partly responsible for forming the Las Vegas Bowl starting in the 1992 season; which continued to give a each team from both the MAC and the Big West Conference a bowl tie-in after the California Raisin Bowl ceased operations the year before. Benson oversaw the conference's Mid-American Conference men's basketball tournament change venues from Cobo Arena in Detroit to Battelle Hall in Columbus, Ohio, beginning in the 1992-93 men's basketball season. Benson also oversaw the conference sponsor men's soccer in 1993. On October 22, 1993, Benson also helped renew the MAC's television deal with ESPN, Pro-Am Sports System (PASS), and SportsChannel to broadcast the members' men's basketball and women's basketball teams.

=== Commissioner of the Western Athletic Conference (WAC) ===
On April 21, 1994, Benson became the 5th commissioner of the Western Athletic Conference to replace, outgoing, Joseph Kearney effective July 1, 1994. During his eighteen years with the WAC, Benson oversaw the conference's membership changing during conference realignment. Benson also coordinated multi-year sports broadcasting deals for the conference to broadcast the conference's football, men's basketball, and women's basketball teams with ABC Sports, ESPN, SportsWest, and Fox Sports Networks.

=== Commissioner of the Sun Belt Conference (SBC) ===
On February 16, 2012, Benson became the 5th commissioner of the Sun Belt Conference. During his seven years with the SBC, Benson oversaw the addition of the five following universities that most recently competed in the Football Championship Subdivision (FCS) and to replace its outgoing members located in Texas, Tennessee, and Florida: Appalachian State University, Coastal Carolina University, Georgia Southern University, Georgia State University, and Texas State University. Benson also extended the conference's television deal with ESPN, the conference's primary and sole sports broadcasting partner, into the 2027-28 season. Additionally, any game not selected to broadcast on ESPN's linear television networks (ABC, ESPN, ESPN2 or ESPNU) would be streamed on ESPN+.

After leaving the Sun Belt Conference, Benson became an associate for CarrSports Consulting: A Florida-based consulting company that conducts nationwide searches for athletic administrators and athletics management.

== Personal life ==
Benson married to his first wife and Boise State alum: Sallee Ann Kosterman on August 3, 1974.

Benson then married to Flight attendant Sharon Ryan from Tacoma, Washington, in 1979. The couple birthed a daughter named Jessica in 1992.

In 1983, Benson got his first hole in one in Tumwater, Washington, at Tumwater Valley Golf Club's 2nd hole from 157 yards out.

Benson currently resides in Denver with his third wife: Sarah Glaza. The couple married in October 2016.
