= History of the University of Texas at Arlington (1965–present) =

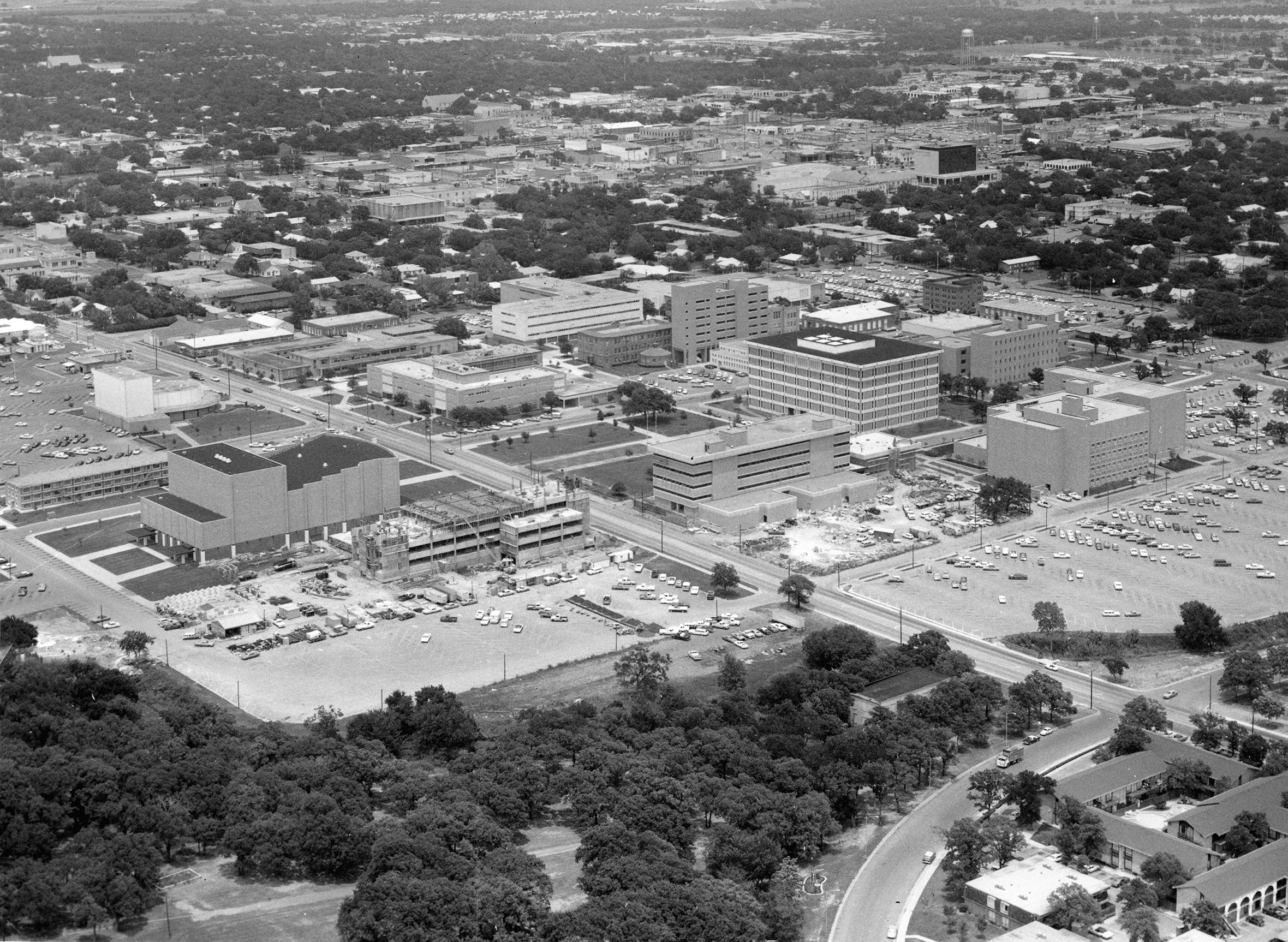
Aerial view of the University of Texas at Arlington campus, 1967–1969

In April 1965, the Texas Legislature transferred Arlington State College (ASC) from the Texas A&M University System to the University of Texas System (UT System). The following year, Maxwell Scarlett was the first African-American graduate in ASC history. In March 1967, ASC was renamed the University of Texas at Arlington (UTA). Jack Woolf, president of ASC and UTA since 1959, resigned in 1968 and was succeeded by Frank Harrison; Harrison was president until 1972. UTA awarded its first master's degrees in 1968, all in engineering. Reby Cary, the university's first African-American administrator, was hired the following year.

Wendell Nedderman succeeded Harrison as UTA president in 1972, serving for 20 years. During his tenure the university constructed 24 buildings, created 64 new degree programs, and grew from 14,028 students to 25,135. UTA's student demographics changed substantially under Nedderman. The ratio of male to female students shifted from about 2:1 to nearly 1:1; African Americans increased from 2.6 to 7.2 percent of the student body, Hispanic students increased from 1.9 to 6.3 percent, and Asian and Pacific Islander students increased from less than one to 8.5 percent. By the mid-1970s, UTA was one of Texas' most accessible universities for disabled students.

In April 1992, Nedderman was succeeded as university president by Ryan C. Amacher. Focused on recruiting minority students and employees and aggressively marketing the university, Amacher and his administration polarized the campus before his sudden resignation in March 1995 amid charges that he showed budgetary favoritism to athletics and spent too much on non-essentials at the expense of academic programs. He was replaced by University of Texas at Austin dean Robert Witt, as UTA's enrollment declined for seven consecutive years during the 1990s. Enrollment increased again by 1999, reaching an all-time high of 25,297 students in fall 2004. In November 2003, Michigan State University dean James D. Spaniolo succeeded Witt as president. Spaniolo was succeeded a decade later by Vistasp Karbhari, who resigned in 2020 in the face of a lawsuit by a former vice president and the release of an audit.

The UTA campus has grown since 1965; new buildings include College Park Center, the Engineering Research Building, and the Science and Engineering Innovation and Research (SEIR) Building. Student traditions have developed, which include bed racing, oozeball, and International Week. Notable athletics events during the UTA era include the termination of the university's football program in 1985, the women's volleyball team advancing to the Final Four in the 1989 NCAA Division I women's volleyball tournament, and national championships for the Movin' Mavs (nine) and Lady Movin' Mavs (two) wheelchair basketball teams.

== Last years as Arlington State College (1965–1967) ==
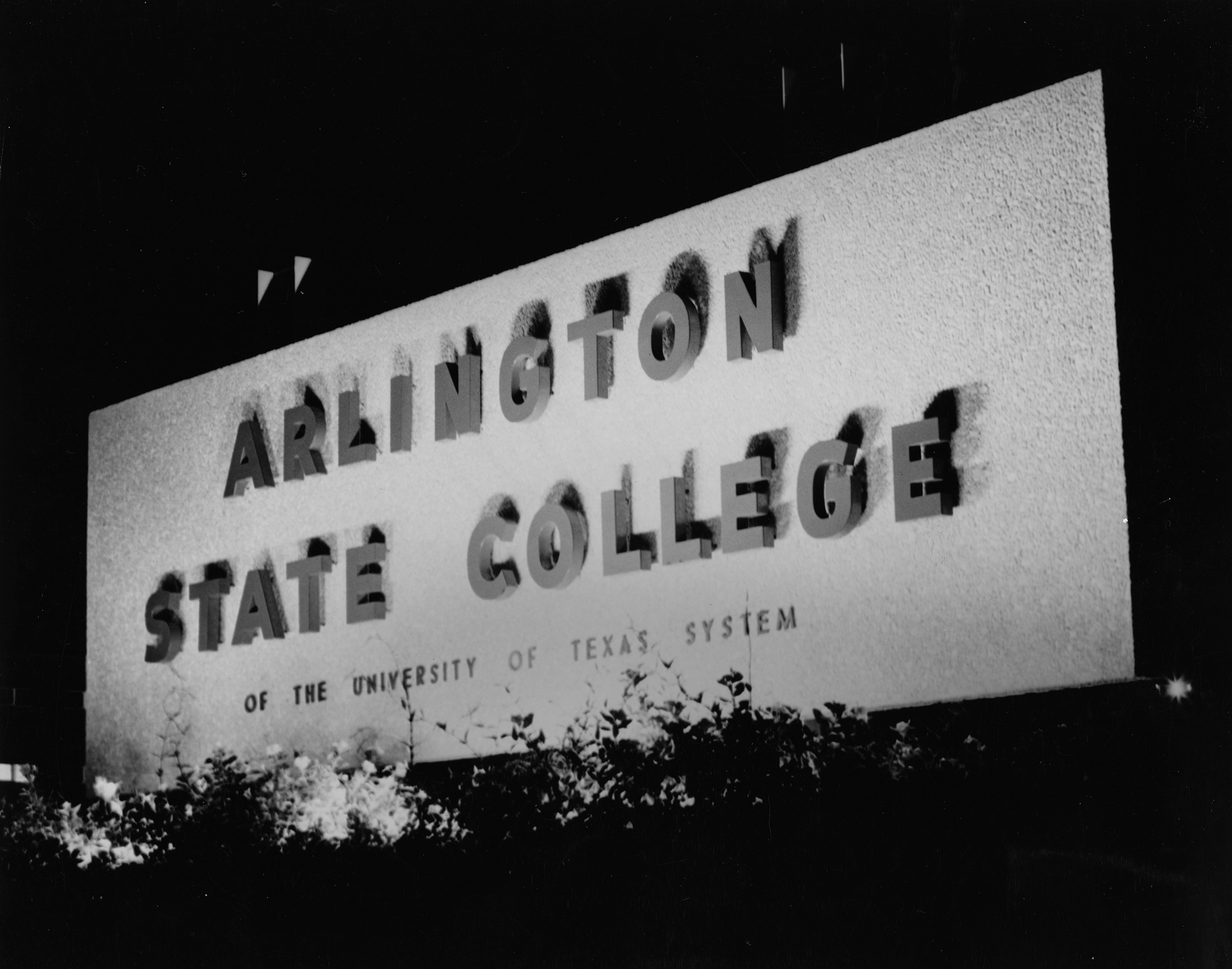
1965–1967 Arlington State College sign, indicating the school as part of the University of Texas System

In April 1965, the Texas Legislature transferred Arlington State College from the Texas A&M University System to the University of Texas System (UT System). ASC's enrollment was 11,873. Historian Gerald Saxon wrote that the transition included a new ASC requirement that incoming students have an "aptitude for doing college work", measured by SAT scores and high-school class rank. After ASC joined the UT System in 1965, it established its College of Business, College of Liberal Arts, and College of Science. Jack Woolf, college president since 1959, continued in that post after the transition. Shortly after ASC joined the UT System, system chancellor Harry Ransom asked Southwestern Medical School associate dean for graduate studies Frank Harrison to work part-time at ASC establishing graduate programs.

During the mid-1960s, the student body was 75 to 80 percent male. The school had a relatively-large number of nontraditional students: 34 percent of its students were married, 60 percent were 21 or older, and 61 percent worked at least part-time (44 percent at least 20 hours per week). The two Texas counties providing the most students were Tarrant County and then Dallas County; California supplied the most out-of-state students, and Iran the most international students. Maxwell Scarlett was the first African-American graduate in ASC history in 1966, receiving a bachelor's degree in biology after transferring from North Texas State University. ASC had become established as a commuter school by 1967, with only a small number of students living in campus dormitories.

The school had a 1965–66 budget of $9.4 million, of which less than $200,000 was spent on research. It offered bachelor's-degree programs in accounting, government, and sociology by 1966, also introducing a number of secondary teaching certificate programs. During the summer of 1966, ASC was authorized to offer four master's-degree programs beginning that fall. In the mid- to late 1960s, courses in engineering and the sciences were especially popular.

Previously-independent student clubs were allowed to affiliate with national fraternities and sororities in 1966, after the school became part of the UT System; the Texas A&M University System had not permitted national Greek organizations at ASC. In 1967, the first ASC chapters of national fraternities and sororities were established. During the 1966–67 academic year, student representatives were included on university-wide committees for the first time.

== Early years as the University of Texas at Arlington (1967–1972) ==
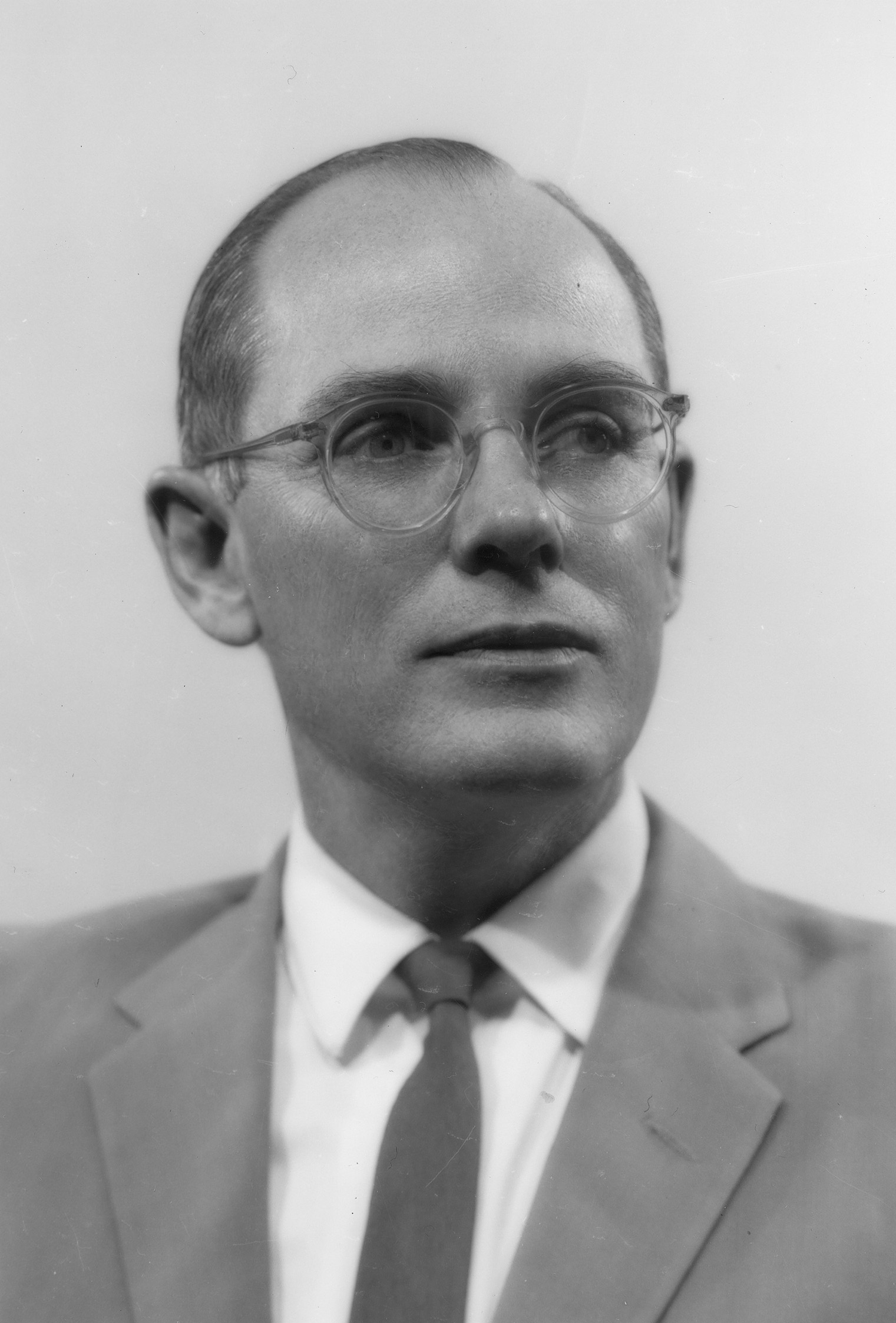
Frank Harrison, UTA president from 1968 to 1972

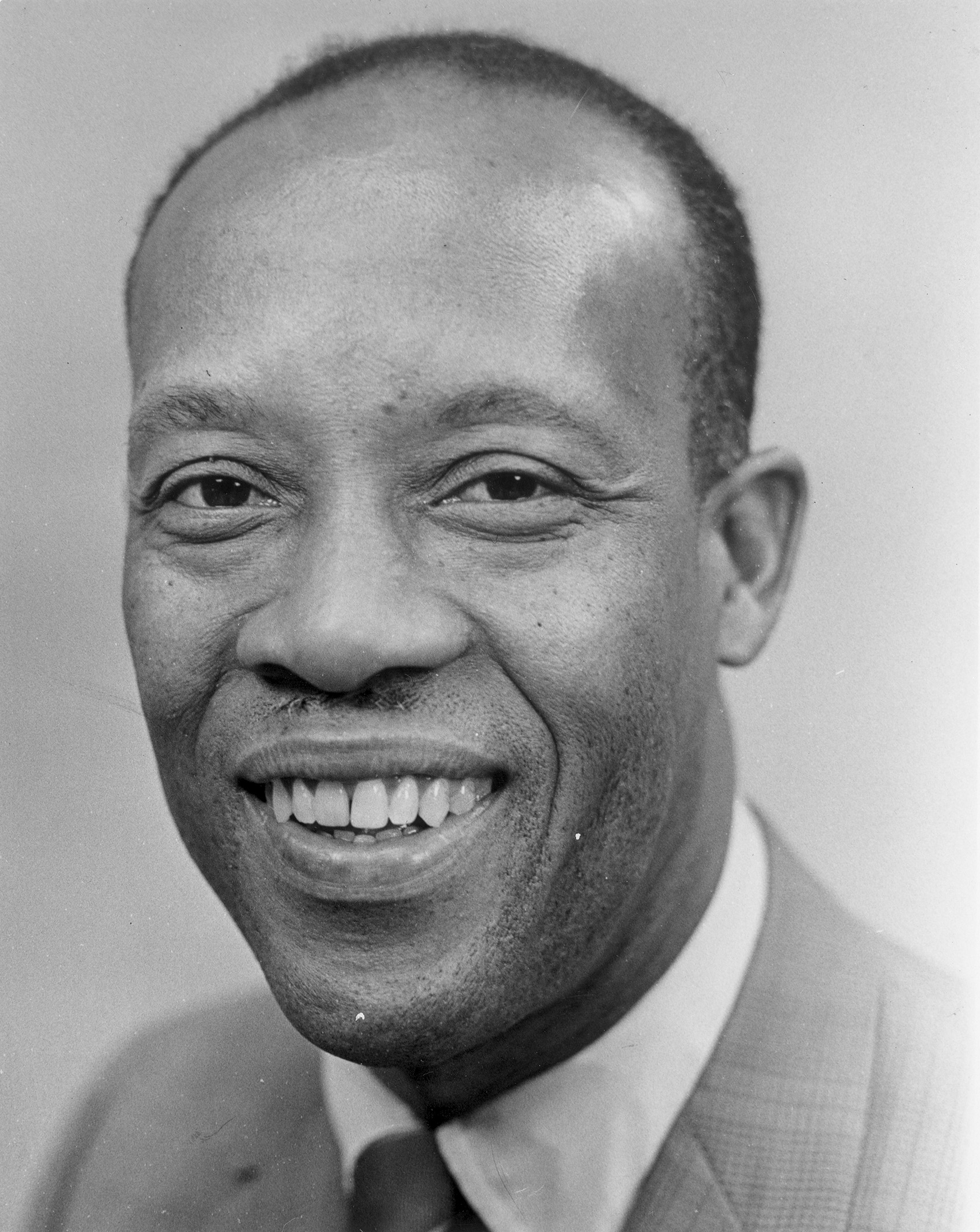
Reby Cary, the first African-American administrator at UTA, circa 1970

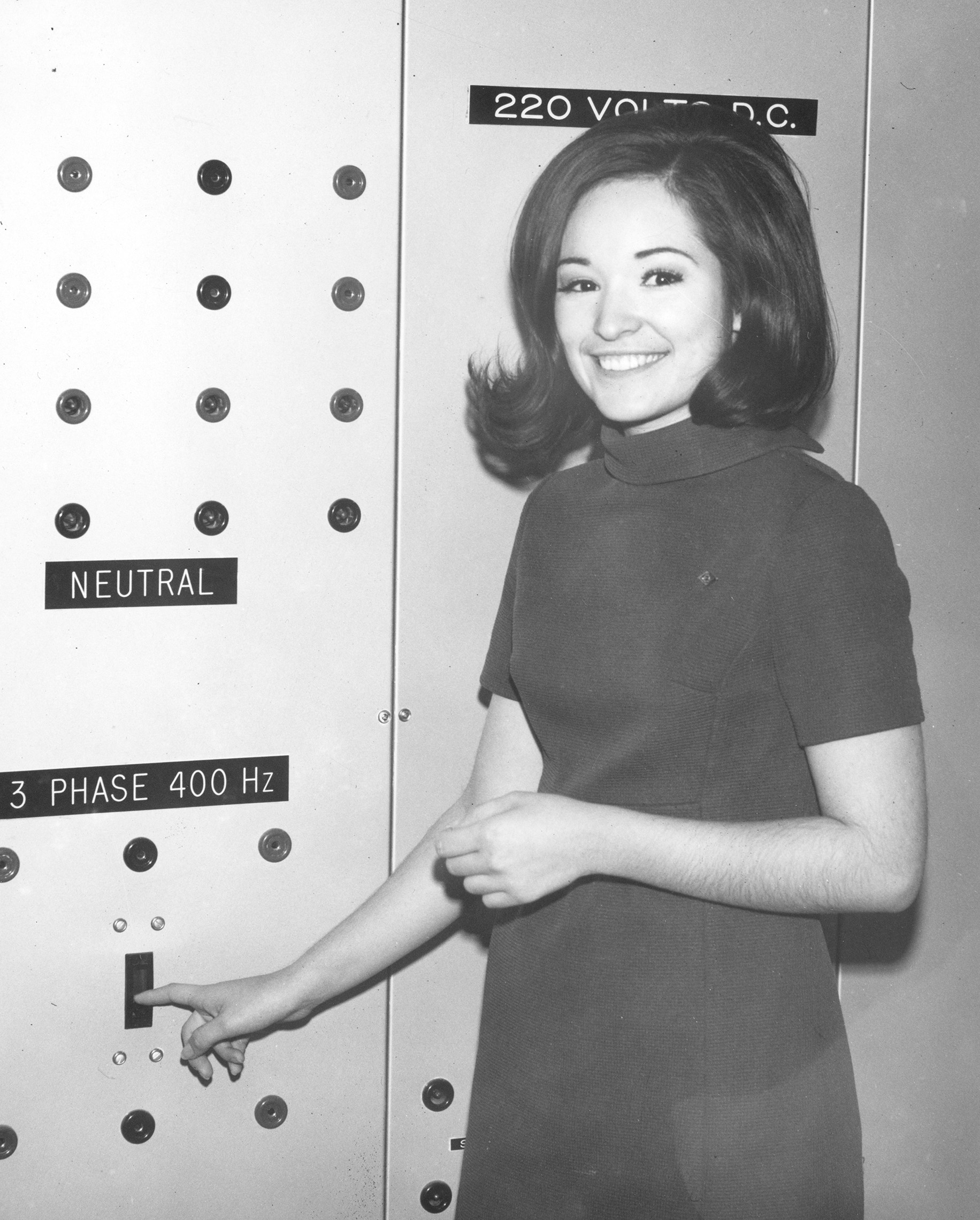
Linda Garza, UTA's first female electrical engineering graduate, in 1970

In March 1967, ASC was renamed the University of Texas at Arlington (UTA). Woolf said, "I think we have reached a name which does not shackle the future development of the institution." On March 6, 1967, Texas governor John Connally signed into law a bill which renamed each UT System university "the University of Texas at [location]". Unlike the previous plan of the Texas A&M University System to rename ASC "Texas A&M University at Arlington", UTA's new name was received positively by students, faculty, and administrators. It was widely perceived as increasing the university's prestige, name recognition, and funding and recruiting abilities. The first degrees with the new name were awarded on May 31, 1967.

UTA's September 1967 enrollment increased to an all-time high of 11,873, despite the opening of the first Tarrant County Junior College (TCJC) campus that fall. That year, the Institute of Urban Studies was established at UTA by the Texas Legislature. The institute provides planning for economic development, site selection, transportation and feasibility studies.

Woolf resigned as president in 1968, continuing as a mechanical-engineering professor until his 1989 retirement. Gerald Saxon wrote that Woolf had lost faculty confidence, due largely to his support for remaining in the A&M system and a hierarchical view of leadership unsuited to the UT System. During his decade as president, Woolf guided the university from junior- to senior-college status, from the A&M system to the UT System, from an enrollment under 5,000 to approximately 12,000, and from a budget of $2.2 million to $11.8 million. In 1966–67, the average salary for full professors was $12,400 to $13,500. By 1968, when Woolf resigned, faculty salaries at UTA were the fourth-highest in Texas; they were the lowest at any state university or college when he was appointed president in 1959. In 1995, UTA renamed the first building constructed during his presidency Woolf Hall.

Frank Harrison replaced Woolf as president until 1972. Appointed acting president shortly after Woolf resigned in September 1968, Harrison was appointed president after a nation-wide search which concluded in June 1969. A native of Dallas, he was educated at Southern Methodist University and Northwestern University before becoming an anatomy professor at the University of Tennessee and Southwestern Medical School. Harrison began organizing UTA's graduate program in 1965, and was familiar with the university, the system, and the Dallas–Fort Worth metroplex by the time he was named acting president two years later. Although was president for only four years, Harrison left a legacy of new programs at UTA: 10 at the bachelor's level, 24 at the master's level, and two at the doctoral level. Another Harrison legacy was his transformation of UTA's administrative culture, making it more democratic and open than during the A&M era. He improved communication, gave faculty seats on committees, and published the university budget for the first time. Enrollment during Harrison's tenure grew from 12,556 in fall 1968 to 14,028 in fall 1972. Much of the growth was due to an expansion in graduate enrollment from 301 to 1,008 from 1968 to 1972.

UTA's Energy Research Center was founded in 1968 to study electrical generation and transmission, and it was followed by over ten other research centers in other fields. The school awarded its first master's degrees (all in engineering), began its business graduate programs, and its School of Social Work began offering the region's first master's degree in social work that year. The School of Social Work added a bachelor's-degree program in 1979 and a doctoral program in 1983. It has been housed since its 1968 inception in the former Ousley Junior High School building on the north edge of campus, built in 1922 as Arlington High School. In 1969, UTA began a Bachelor of Fine Arts program and a doctoral program in engineering. Reby Cary, the university's first African-American administrator, became the associate dean of student life that year.

The University of Texas at Dallas (UTD) in Richardson, founded as a private institution in 1961 by Texas Instruments, joined the UT System in 1969. UTA was neutral on the addition of UTD to the system, but state representative Don Gladden, Arlington mayor Tom Vandergriff, and Tarrant County representative W. C. Sherman were opposed. Governor Preston Smith achieved a compromise which placated UTA and UTD supporters by initially restricting UTD to junior-, senior- and graduate-level courses until it began awarding bachelor's degrees in 1975, giving UTA six more years as the region's only comprehensive public university.

In 1970, Linda Garza was the first woman to graduate with a degree in electrical engineering from UTA. Between 1970 and 1973, UTA phased out its two-year associate degree programs in engineering and transferred them to TCJC. In August 1971, the school awarded its first doctoral degrees. The Department of Health, Education, and Welfare mandated that the university implement an employment affirmative action program by February 1972 that year, after determining that less than one percent of the university's employees in 1970 belonged to minority groups.

== Continued growth (1972–1992) ==
Harrison resigned in 1972 to become president of the University of Texas Health Science Center at San Antonio, and Wendell Nedderman was named his successor at UTA. Saxon described Nedderman as "a popular choice" who was "genuinely liked and admired by staff and faculty". Nedderman, a native of Iowa, was educated at Iowa State University and Texas A&M University before serving on the USS Patterson during World War II. In 1947, he began working at Texas A&M before becoming the engineering dean at UTA in 1959. In Arlington, Nedderman was a graduate-school administrator, vice president for research and graduate affairs, and vice president for academic affairs before he was named acting president in 1972. Nedderman was president until July 1992; during his tenure, the university constructed 24 buildings, created 64 new degree programs, and its student body increased from 14,028 to 25,135 students.

Graduate enrollment increased from 936 to over 4,200 under Nedderman. Saxon wrote that the main causes of this growth were the baby boomers' coming of age, the growing size and economic strength of the Dallas-Fort Worth metroplex, the relatively-low cost of attending UTA, the expansion of its programs, and the growth of regional junior colleges which prepared students for UTA. Nedderman's tenure saw an increase in research and publishing by UTA with its developing graduate programs. The university had $200,000 in outside research funding in 1972, increasing to $12.7 million by Nedderman's 1992 retirement.

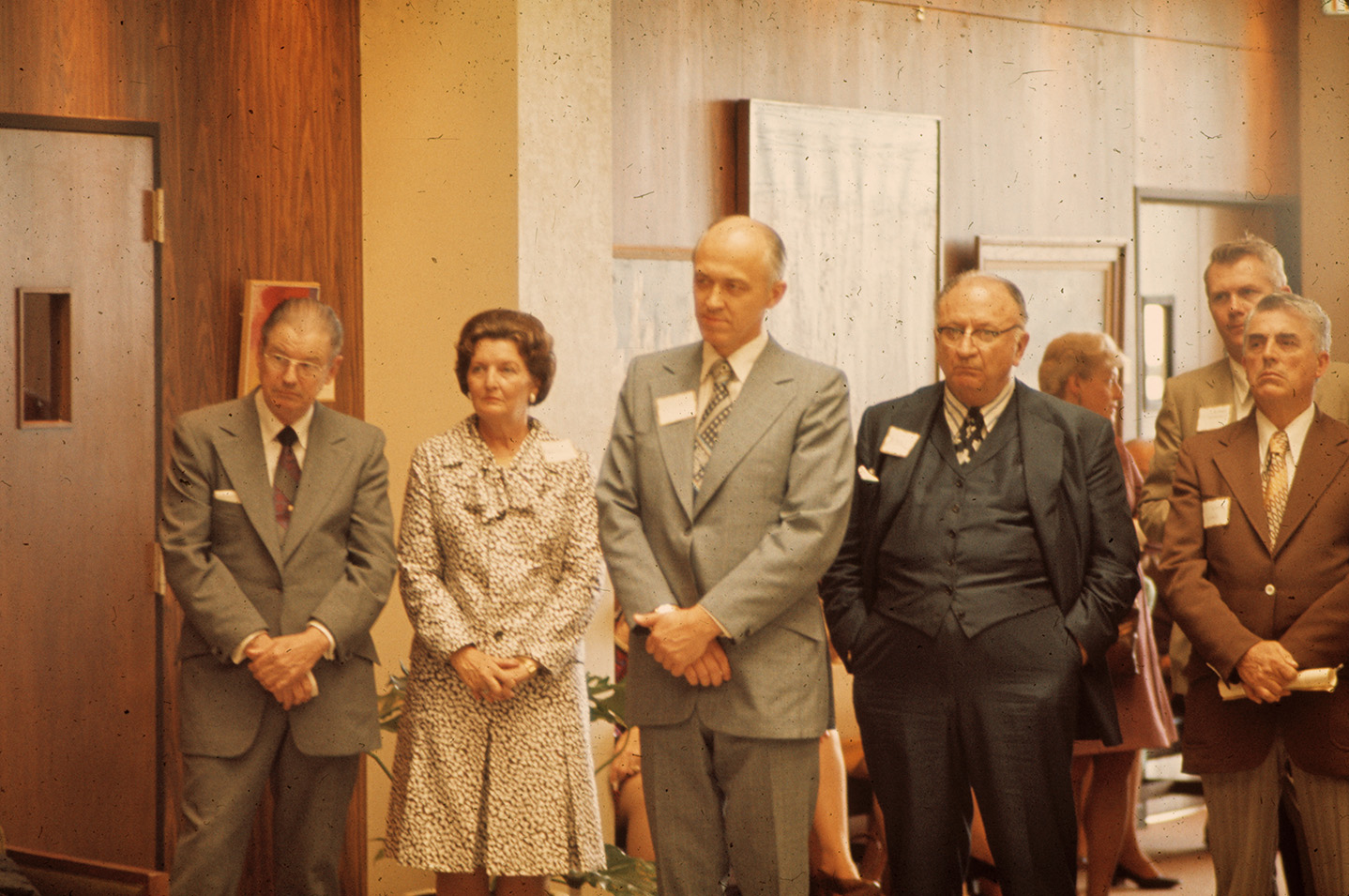
(left to right) Jenkins Garrett, Virginia Garrett, Wendell Nedderman and others in the Central Library atrium

The 1970s saw an expansion of UTA's curriculum and services, including joint doctoral programs with the University of Texas Health Center in Dallas and UTD in biomedical engineering, the humanities, and mathematical sciences. The school's English Department created the quarterly Pre/Text, An Inter-disciplinary Journal of Rhetoric journal during that decade, focusing on rhetorical theory. In 1974, the UTA library's special-collections department opened with a donation of over 10,000 books, documents, and maps from Jenkins and Virginia Garrett. The department includes material on the history of Texas, the Southwest, and Mexico. UTA's Foreign Language and Linguistics Department published the German-instruction journal Schatzkammer around this time, and began publishing the Robertson Colony papers in 1977.

In 1972, UTA created a Minority Student Advocacy Caucus and established a Minorities Cultural Center at its library. Between 1970 and 1979, UTA's African-American enrollment increased from 176 to 1,065 and its Hispanic enrollment from 157 to 594. The 1970s and early 1980s saw a number of African-American firsts at UTA: Dickie Fears become the first African-American cheerleader in 1971, and Royce West become the first African-American president of UTA's Student Congress in 1974. Wanda Holiday was UTA's first African-American homecoming queen in 1980, and Rodney Lewis was its first homecoming king.

UTA was one of Texas' most accessible universities for disabled students by the mid-1970s, largely due to the activism of the Handicapped Student Association (HSA) and an administration willing to improve accessibility. Office for Students with Disabilities director Jim Hayes said in 1994, "I work at probably the greatest university in the world when it comes to a real commitment to the advancement of disabled students. Based on the national picture, UTA has the premiere program from a funding and policy standpoint."

In 1975, the Department of Architecture separated from the College of Liberal Arts and became the independent School of Architecture. By the following year, UTA had four colleges; schools of architecture and environmental design, nursing, and social work, and the Institute of Urban Studies. The University of Texas School of Nursing at Fort Worth was transferred to UTA in 1976, becoming the School (later the College) of Nursing. Renamed the College of Nursing and Health Innovation (CONHI), it is headquartered in Pickard Hall (named for the school's founding dean, Myrna Pickard). In 1978, UTA created the Office of Continuing Education to provide cultural enrichment, activities, and non-credit courses.

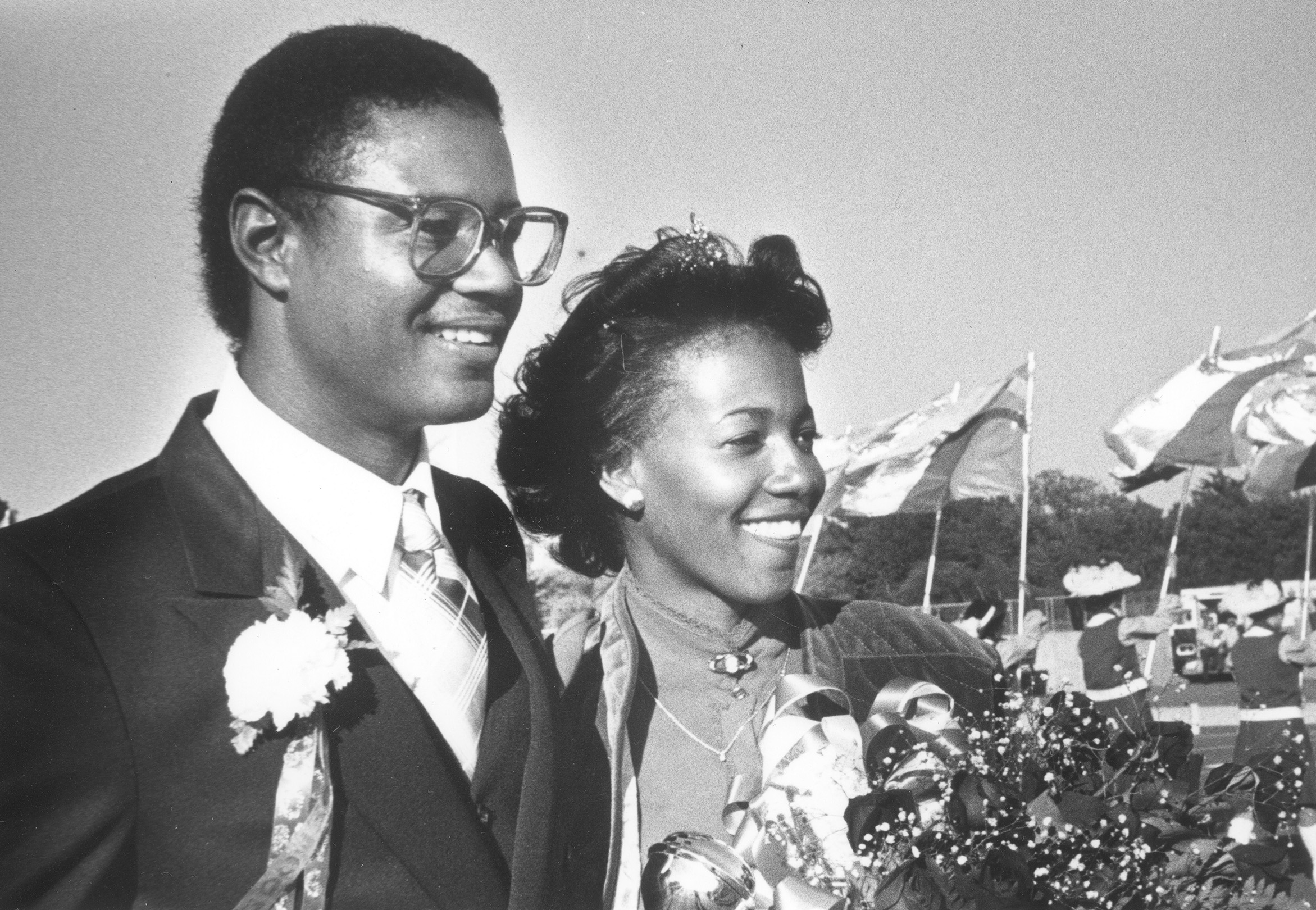
Rodney Lewis and Wanda Jo Holiday, 1980 UTA homecoming king and queen

Enrollment at UTA reached 23,245 by fall 1986, making it the second-largest university in the UT System. That semester, the university offered 49 baccalaureate, 53 master's, and 18 doctoral programs. Its library had acquired 970,000 volumes, more than double the 400,000 volumes it held in 1969. Its Special Collections department had acquired materials relating to cartographic history, the Mexican–American War, minority cultures, the Robertson Colony, and Texas labor and political history.

Texas' Select Committee on Higher Education recognized the University of Houston (UH), the University of North Texas (UNT), and Texas Tech University as emerging national research universities in December 1986, calling UTA a "comprehensive university" focused on teaching. Many faculty blamed the Nedderman administration for not demonstrating more clearly to the state government and the public that UTA also merited emerging-research-university status. Nedderman urged faculty members to write letters to their elected representatives and held a rally for students and faculty in support of research status. Local politicians, including state senator Bob McFarland, Fort Worth mayor Bob Bolen, and the Arlington City Council supported the university's campaign. In February 1987, Select Committee chairman Larry Temple announced in February 1987 that UTA had been upgraded to a research university, and its earlier designation was not intended to be "limiting".

Many faculty believed that Nedderman had become resistant to change by the early 1990s, delegating excessive authority to UTA's college deans. Nedderman announced his intention to retire at the end of 1991; UT System chancellor Hans Mark asked him to remain until his replacement was hired, and he retired on July 13, 1992. According to Saxon, "Nedderman's years as president were characterized by an atmosphere of open communication, a free flow of information, and teamwork". Nedderman's administrative team also exhibited longevity, with three of his four vice presidents serving for his entire presidency. Saxon summed up Nedderman's presidency: "Critics would say he was well liked in Austin because he did not make waves for the system, but the reality was that Nedderman was an effective advocate for UTA and a skillful political player." He wrote that Nedderman's greatest shortcomings were not effectively raising money from beyond the system, especially from alumni, and his inability to recruit minorities for administrative and faculty positions.

By the end of Nedderman's tenure in 1992, UTA student demographics had changed substantially since he became president. The ratio of male to female students shifted from about 2:1 to nearly 1:1; African Americans increased from 2.6 to 7.2 percent of the student body, Hispanic students from 1.9 to 6.3 percent, and Asian and Pacific Island students from less than one to 8.5 percent. In 1992, 47.6 percent of UTA students were 25 or older. In student surveys during the Nedderman era, students consistently reported that their top reasons for enrolling at UTA were its location, low tuition, and academic reputation.

== Turmoil and decreasing enrollment (1992–1999) ==
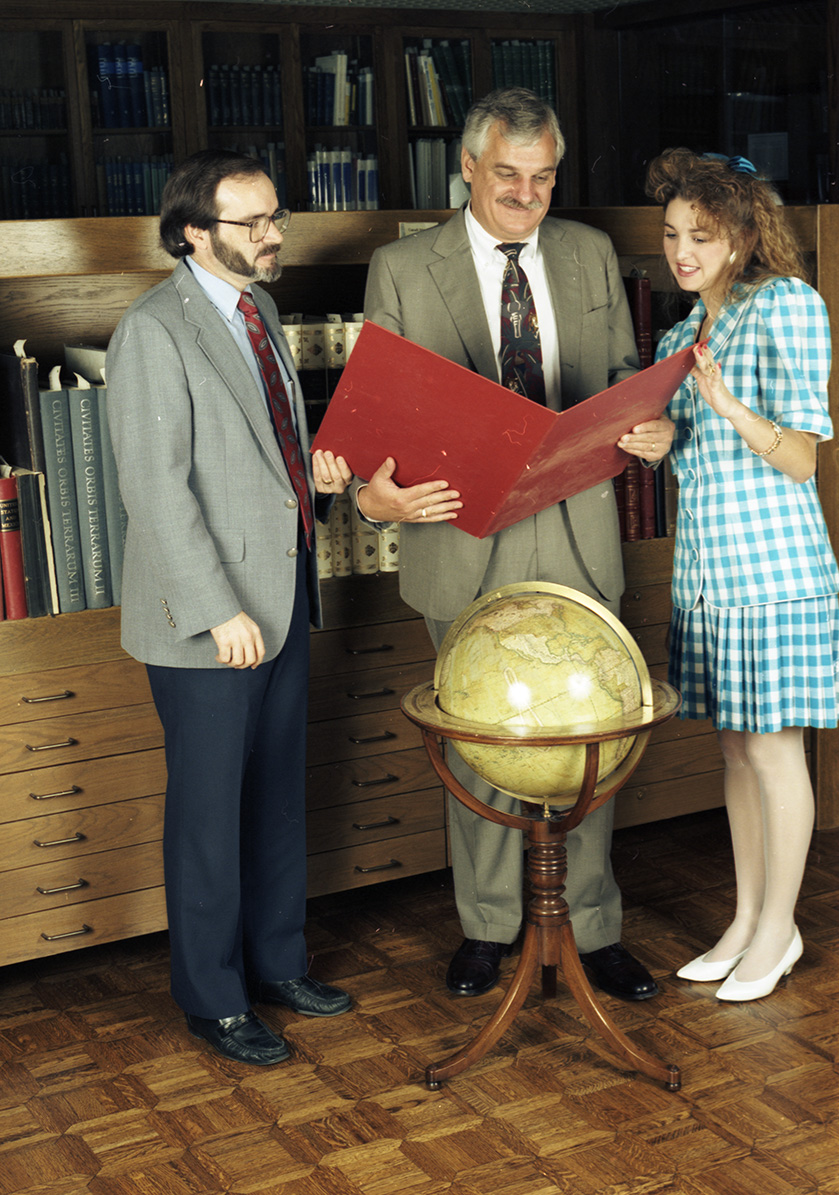
Gerald Saxon, UTA president Ryan C. Amacher, and an unidentified woman in the UTA Library's Special Collections during the 1990s

In April 1992, Nedderman was succeeded as university president by Ryan C. Amacher. At his inauguration, Amacher promised to recruit minority students and employees to UTA and to market the university. A Wisconsin native, Amacher was educated at Ripon College and the University of Virginia. He taught at the University of Oklahoma, Arizona State University, and Clemson University, where he was dean of the College of Commerce and Industry. At Clemson, Amacher gained a reputation as a capable fundraiser with enthusiasms for marketing and outreach. He also worked briefly for the United States Department of the Treasury.

Amacher had many early meetings with campus stakeholders who highlighted the widespread desire for change after 20 years of Nedderman's administration. His first challenge was an eight-percent decline in enrollment during his first three fall semesters, jeopardizing UTA's funding because of Texas' university-allocation policy. Concerned that raising admission standards would result in fewer students and less funding, Amacher blocked a plan (supported by many faculty) to raise standards in fall 1992. By 1993, enrollment was 24,783; as administrators retired or resigned, Amacher began assembling a team which suited him. Among his additions was provost Dalmas Taylor from the University of Delaware, UTA's highest-ranking African American.

As part of his plan to marketing UTA, Amacher invested in its athletics program. Hiring former Clemson colleague B. J. Skeleton as athletic director in October 1992, he brought UTA athletics into compliance with Title IX. Amacher spent an additional $500,000 on athletics in 1994, raising its budget to $2.9 million and funding additional personnel and facilities improvements. According to Saxon, it was the first time in UTA history that "an administration was willing to invest significantly in athletics and make sports a priority". Although Amacher said that "real universities do athletics" and his goal was for athletics to "enhance academic programs across the campus", Saxon noted that many on campus saw this as "a costly gamble destined to lose".

Amacher also turned his attention to the lack of student housing on campus. When he was named president, UTA had only four residence halls and owned 17 apartment complexes around its campus. In 1993, it joined the Houston-based Century Property Management Company to open the Centennial Court Apartments southwest of campus as a public–private partnership. After its second phase was completed in 1995, the complex housed nearly 1,000 students. As part of the partnership, Century paid for the costs of construction and management of the apartments on land leased from the university. It and UTA split the profits, and the apartments will become university property in 30 years.

History professor Alusine Jalloh established the Africa Program in 1994, which provides opportunities for study abroad, outreach projects, and guest lecturers (including Desmond Tutu). During the 1990s, about seven percent of UTA's students were African American and six percent were Hispanic. Since the ASC era, students at UTA were generally older than those at other colleges; they worked more, were more likely to be part-time students, and most lived off campus.

By the mid-1990s, Amacher was working with the city of Arlington on a proposed 19,000-seat multi-purpose arena to accommodate UTA athletics and events and as the possible home arena for the Dallas Mavericks of the National Basketball Association and the Dallas Stars of the National Hockey League. The arena was never built, and Amacher implemented a single graduation ceremony for the entire university in spring 1994 instead of the traditional, separate ceremonies held by UTA's nine colleges and schools. Faculty and students objected to a ceremony they saw as "long, impersonal, and inconvenient", in part because it was held at the Tarrant County Convention Center in Fort Worth instead of on the UTA campus.

Many on campus also disagreed with Amacher's funding priorities, such as spending $186,000 to move university administrative offices from Davis Hall to the more centrally located College Hall and spending $218,000 to convert unused space in the university center to "an upscale dining and meeting facility ideal for entertaining donors and potential donors". Such spending decisions, coupled with what many saw as misdirected support for athletics, a centralized decision-making style, inability to tolerate criticism, and insensitivity to the desires of students and employees led to increasing criticism of Amacher from students, faculty, and staff. Over an 18-month period, his house was vandalized four times. Supporters of the Amacher administration highlighted its success in increasing UTA's visibility, diversifying its faculty and student body, and strengthening ties with alumni and the local community. As Saxon described the situation by fall 1994, "the university was divided into two warring camps, and President Amacher and Provost Taylor seemed incapable of unifying the campus".

Rebecca Sherman wrote "Fast Times at UTA" a January 1995 Dallas Observer article critical of the Amacher administration which ended with a quote from a former dean that the campus resembled a wagon "going down the street with all the wheels coming off it". Sherman's article, combined with similar stories in The Shorthorn and the Fort Worth Star-Telegram, convinced UT System chancellor William H. Cunningham to audit UTA's finances and management. Before the audit was completed, UTA's Faculty Senate approved the circulation of a petition which would force Amacher to call a faculty meeting and address their concerns. If the faculty were unsatisfied with the meeting, they could serve a motion of no confidence on Amacher and his administration. Amacher objected to the criticism, telling the Faculty Senate that "I've been assassinated unfairly by what is no other fashion than a conspiracy." Forty-five percent of eligible faculty members signed the petition by February 17 (the required threshold was 10 percent), and a meeting of Amacher and the Faculty Senate was scheduled for March 8.

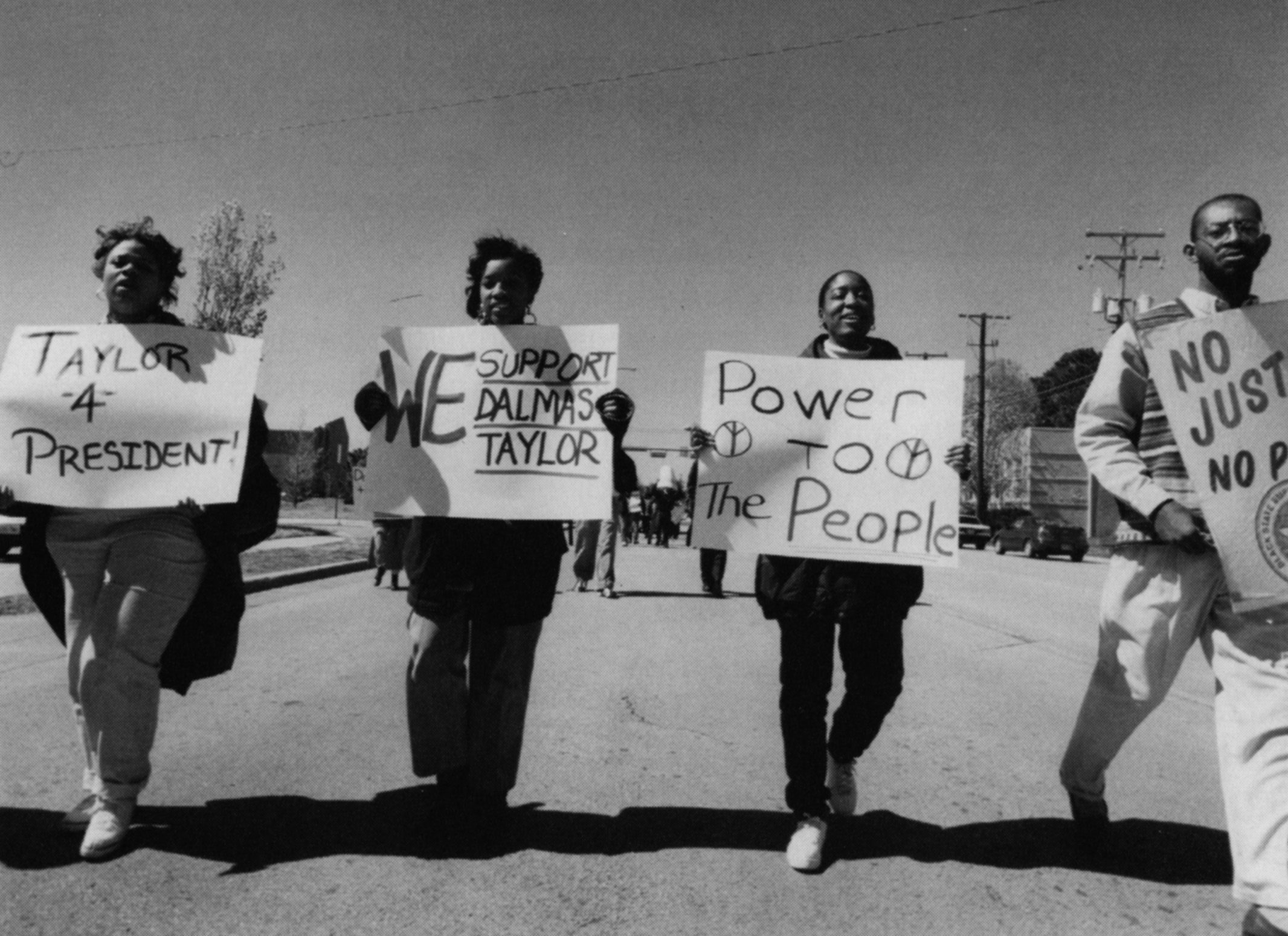
Black students advocating for Dalmas Taylor as interim president, 1995

On March 6, Amacher abruptly announced his resignation in the face of charges that he showed budgetary favoritism to athletics and spent too much on non-essentials at the expense of academic programs. He said that he resigned "to put an end to the circus atmosphere that has developed on campus". Shortly after Amacher's resignation, African-American students, faculty, and community members (including Dallas NAACP president Lee Alcorn and Darren Reagen of the Black State Employees Association) advocated the appointment of Dalmas Taylor as interim president. Because Amacher had resigned, he did not attend the March 8 Faculty Senate meeting; Taylor, a provost, did. Although some admired his courage in addressing the faculty, few of those opposed to him changed their mind after the meeting. A faculty vote of confidence in Taylor was held, and the March 27 results indicated no confidence by a 9-to-1 margin; according to Saxon, the vote "surprised even the administration's most vocal critics". It was rumored that the decision was at least partially related to race, with African American pre-medicine major Tasha Kendricks calling the vote a "witch hunt and public lynching of an African American". Before Amacher was hired in 1992 and after he resigned in 1995, campus African-American organizations unsuccessfully advocated for a Black president. No Blacks were on the faculty-only search committee, and none were finalists.

University of Texas at Austin dean Robert Witt, who intended to serve for at least two years, was named interim president in 1995. Chancellor Cunningham knew Witt well, and selected him largely due to his administrative experience, calm demeanor (in contrast to Amacher), and his status as an outsider "untainted by the controversies" at UTA. He explained why he did not hire Taylor as president: "There was simply too much bitterness on this campus. We felt we needed to get someone [from] off this campus to begin to heal that process." Witt joined Amacher as the second UTA president with a business background.

He was a native of Connecticut who was educated at Bates College, Dartmouth College, and Pennsylvania State University. Witt had worked at UT Austin since 1968, rising from assistant professor of marketing to department chair in 1973, associate dean for academic affairs in 1983, and permanent dean in 1986. During his introductory press conference at UTA, he pledged to develop a campus culture "characterized by a mutual respect and trust". Witt received broad authority to assemble his administrative team, with the principal goal of restoring tranquility on campus and reconciling the pro- and anti-Amacher camps. He faced challenges from the beginning of his administration which included racial tension, involving campus stakeholders in decision-making, repairing UTA's reputation, transparency with the press, and establishing stronger ties with alumni and the community.

Taylor was replaced as provost by George C. Wright, an African-American vice provost at Duke University. This angered some of UTA's African-American students, who demanded the resignation of UT System chancellor William Cunningham for his audit which led to Taylor's dismissal. Less than a week after the audit placed the blame for campus turmoil "squarely on President Amacher and Provost Taylor", Witt replaced Taylor's team.

By 1995, UTA had Doctoral University I status in the Carnegie Classification of Institutions of Higher Education. Most on campus believed that it would eventually attain the classification's highest status, Research I (already held by UT Austin and Texas A&M University). That year, UTA celebrated its centennial. President emeritus Nedderman said, "With all due respect to General Motors ... UTA is the heartbeat of Arlington". The August 30 celebration included other speakers, a parade, a salute by the Carlisle cannons, and the unveiling of a marker outlining the university's history.

Enrollment fell for the fifth consecutive year in fall 1996, to 21,097. By fall 1998, enrollment dropped to 19,121 – over 6,000 students fewer than the 1993 enrollment. The number of faculty members also decreased to 1,214. During the 1990s, male enrollment fell in numbers and percentage: from 12,484 (53 percent of the student body) in 1993 to 9,526 (49 percent) by 1997. UTA established the Center for Professional Teacher Education in 1997, which evolved into the School of Education in 1999 and the College of Education in 2003.

== Return to growth and stability (1999–2020) ==
Enrollment increased to 19,148 students in fall 1999, reversing seven consecutive years of decline. It increased to 20,424 the following fall, up almost 2,000 in two years but down over 4,000 students since 1993. Minority enrollment increased by 18 percent in fall 2001 from the previous year; African Americans were 11.8 percent of the student body, Hispanic students 10.6 percent, Asian Americans 9.67 percent, and Native Americans 0.78 percent. Student enrollment grew by 12.5 percent in fall 2002, its largest increase since 1991 and the greatest increase of UT System students at the time. India provided the largest group of international students, 45.3 percent that semester. In August 2002, an increase in demand for dormitory housing generated a wait list of about 1,000. However, the number of tenured faculty decreased by 17 percent between 1995 and 2001. By summer 2003, the university's increased enrollment outpaced its growth in funding. Fall 2003 full-time enrollment reached 13,972, and the average student age decreased. The total September 2004 enrollment reached 25,297, an all-time university record.

In July 1999, a UT system Board of Regents committee proposed creating flagship universities in the system similar to the University of California system. Some supporters of the plan advocated for UT Dallas, UT San Antonio, and the University of Houston to receive flagship status, and Witt said that UTA would also be considered. In March 2001, state representative Kenn George proposed a bill which would have merged UTA with UTD and the UT Southwestern Medical Center and created a flagship university in North Texas. Witt supported the bill. A similar bill, proposed by state senator Chris Harris and supported by Witt, endeavored to increase funding for non-flagship universities and would have benefited UTA. In March 2003, state representative Toby Goodman proposed legislation to separate UTA from the UT system and give it an independent board of regents to ensure that the university "receives a fair share of funding and is treated equally in the system".

The honors program at UTA was upgraded to an honors college in 1999, the first of its kind in North Texas and the third in the state. Witt cut UTA's graduate French and German programs in November 2002, saying that they were a "well-designed program with excellent faculty but not enough graduate enrollment to be able to economically back it".

In 2001, UTA collaborated with the city of Arlington and its chamber of commerce to begin the Arlington Technology Incubator; it was dedicated and fully functional by 2005. The incubator intended to aid "technology-based entrepreneurial ventures in the community". In August 2002, the UTA budget was $247.1 million, the largest in university history. In September 2004, the university's budget had grown to $310.6 million. As part of efforts to reduce its budget by $9 million to comply with state mandates in April 2010, UTA offered buyouts to over 200 staff members. In March 2011, it offered buyouts to 113 faculty members.

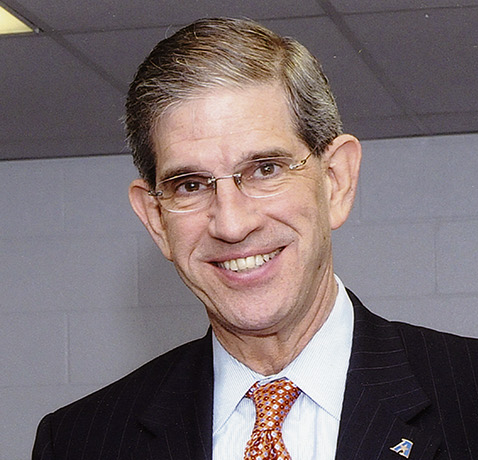
UTA president James D. Spaniolo in 2009

Witt resigned in January 2003 to become president of the University of Alabama. The following month, UT vice chancellor Charles A. Sorber was named interim president of UTA. Michigan State University dean James D. Spaniolo was named UTA's president in November, beginning his tenure in February 2004. The appointment surprised many on campus.

UTA began admitting students who were provisionally accepted to UT Austin in June 2001. In April 2003, UTA signed an agreement with Tarrant County College (TCC) enabling TCC students to more easily transfer to UTA and encouraging them to apply to the university. The UTA Undergraduate Assembly passed a resolution in September of that year to increase admission standards, which was approved by the Board of Regents in November to help recruit students. In November 2004, a UTA committee reported to the university provost that the school's graduation rate was too low. Enrollment for 2006–07 declined slightly, from 25,432 the previous year to 24,832, due in part to tougher admissions standards. In September 2010, UTA inaugurated a university college with the goals of "enhancing student services and improving retention". By fall 2011, the university college was credited with helping to raise UTA's freshman retention rate by four percent (to 74 percent).

An archosaur site was discovered in northern Arlington in 2003, with excavation beginning in 2008 by a team led by UTA paleontologist Derek Main; Main's team discovered a new species of archosaur. Fossils unearthed during the excavation were sent to the Perot Museum of Nature and Science in Dallas. UTA research assistant Brad Carter discovered a fossil of a new species of lungfish in the Woodbine Formation in northern Arlington in 2007. In August 2017, a team of UTA astrophysicists led by Suman Satyal discovered a possible exoplanet orbiting the star Gliese 832.

By fall 2005, the number of African American faculty on campus had fallen to 45; only six were tenured. According to management professor and diversity researcher Myrtle Bell, the number of Black faculty members on campus had been decreasing since 1996.

The College of Education announced a new doctoral program in K-16 Educational Leadership and Policy in fall 2006. In December 2007, Maxine Adegbola and Gloria Carr were the first PhD graduates from UTA's School of Nursing. The school established a Doctor of Nursing Practice program in 2009, and the university began offering an Executive Masters in Business Administration program at its Fort Worth Center.

Carrizo Oil and Gas drilled for natural gas via hydraulic fracturing on campus at Pecan and Mitchell Streets in 2008. The university received its first royalty of over $500,000 from the drilling in January 2009. In September of that year, Carrizo announced that it would drill four to seven additional wells in the southeastern portion of the campus.

Enrollment reached a record 28,084 in fall 2009, a 12-percent increase. The following fall, enrollment reached a record 32,956; UTA's growth rate of 17.3 percent since fall 2009 made it the fastest-growing institution in the UT system. In 2012, UTA had the country's largest number of transfer students (8,649). About 4,300 students lived in campus dormitories by 2013, more than in previous years. By spring 2015, enrollment reached 47,977 (including online students). In fall 2015, UTA had 37,008 Texas-based students. Between fall 2012 and summer 2014, the number of Indian students increased by 56 percent. By summer 2014, nine percent of the student body were international students. In February 2014, UTA was recognized as a Hispanic-serving institution (HSI) when its Hispanic enrollment reached 7,335 (25 percent of total enrollment). By spring 2015, Hispanic enrollment reached 8,062 (a 10-percent increase over spring 2014).

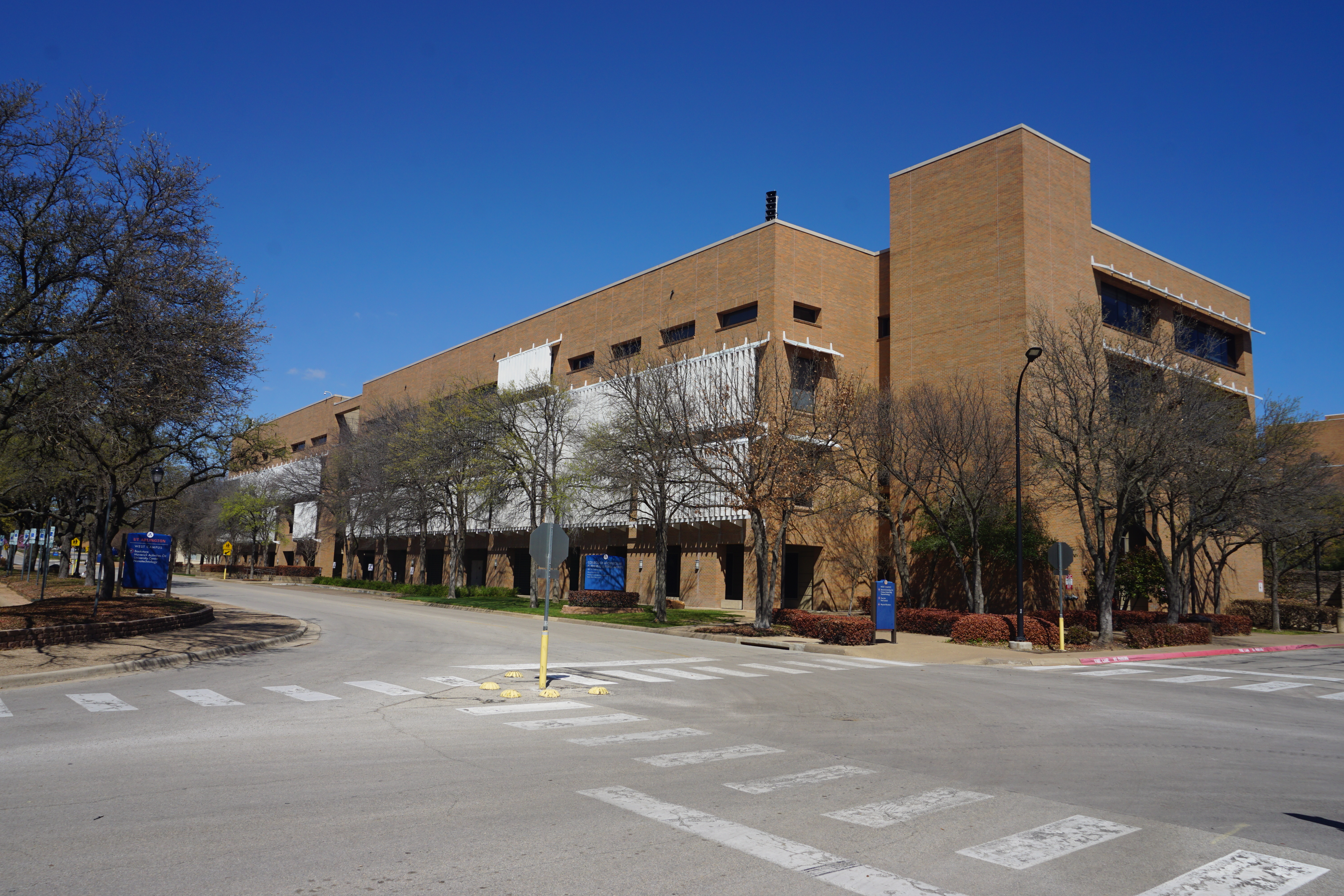
The CAPPA Building in 2021

In January 2010, UTA's School of Nursing became the College of Nursing. The college and the Department of Kinesiology began collaborating on research proposals in September 2014. In November of that year, UTA received permission from the UT System Board of Regents to rename the College of Nursing the College of Nursing and Health Innovation (CONHI) and the College of Education and Health Professions the College of Education. The School of Architecture and the School of Urban and Public Affairs announced that they would merge in January 2015. In November 2015, the schools became the College of Architecture, Planning and Public Affairs (CAPPA).

Spaniolo announced his retirement in June 2012, after a new president was selected. He was succeeded by Vistasp Karbhari, provost at the University of Alabama in Huntsville, on June 1, 2013. Karbhari joined Jack Woolf and Wendell Nedderman as the third UTA president with an engineering background.

UTA's history department established a minor in disability studies program in fall 2013. The College of Business eliminated its bachelor's degree in economics program due to declining enrollment in fall 2014, and the College of Engineering established a new minor in sustainability. The disability-studies minor separated from the history department in fall 2018 (becoming a College of Liberal Arts program), and the College of Business introduced an online Master of Business Administration program.

The UTA Alumni Association disbanded in 2014 after it lost operational and programming support from the university. In July 2015, it was reestablished as an independent organization run by volunteers.

UTA's largest 2015 program was nursing, followed by business. In spring 2016, CONHI's enrollment increased to 12,178: UTA's largest college, with 31.5 percent of the student population. UTA's fall 2017 enrollment increased to 41,715 (a five-percent increase over fall 2016), with its largest freshman class (3,346 students) and highest percentage of female enrollment (59.3 percent). CONHI became the largest college that fall, increasing 16.7 percent since fall 2016. International student enrollment decreased by 233 between fall 2016 and fall 2017, part of a national trend. In February 2018, vice president for enrollment management Troy Johnson credited the university's increasing reputation and greater recognition for its increased enrollment. Hispanic enrollment reached 11,615 that fall, a 7.37-percent increase over fall 2017.

UTA received R1 (Doctoral Universities - Highest Research Activity) status from the Carnegie Classification of Institutions of Higher Education in February 2016. In March 2018, the university college became the Division of Student Success to clearly articulate its purpose. A Chief Sustainability Officer position was created in November 2018 to increase the scope of the Office of Sustainability.

== Crisis and transition (2020–present) ==
State, national, and global events have impacted UTA. On March 12, during the COVID-19 pandemic, UTA announced that it would extend its spring break by one week and resume classes online on March 23. On March 17, UTA decided to conduct all classes for the spring 2020 semester online, require students to move out of residence halls, and postpone spring commencement ceremonies. In April, it made all summer classes online-only. UTA transitioned to a mix of online, in-person and hybrid classes for the fall semester, returning to online-only classes after Thanksgiving. In spring 2021, UTA offered a mix of on-campus, online, and hybrid classes. That semester, UTA mandated masks and daily self-monitoring for COVID-19 symptoms. It returned to primarily on-campus instruction and resumed hosting on-campus events in fall 2021, mandating randomized COVID-19 testing of 20 percent of its students, faculty, and staff each week.

Karbhari announced his resignation on March 4, 2020, a month after a former vice president filed a $200,000 lawsuit against the university accusing Karbhari of bullying and threatening to fire her. Planning to resign on August 31, Karbhari resigned on March 19 after the release of a 2019 audit suggesting that UTA violated university rules, UT system rules, and state laws. Provost Teik Lim was named administrator in charge on March 19, and interim president on May 2. Lim, formerly a dean at the University of Cincinnati, joined UTA as provost and vice president for academic affairs in June 2017. In January 2022, he became president of the New Jersey Institute of Technology. Later that month, UNT provost and vice president of academic affairs Jennifer Evans-Cowley was the sole finalist for the UTA presidency.

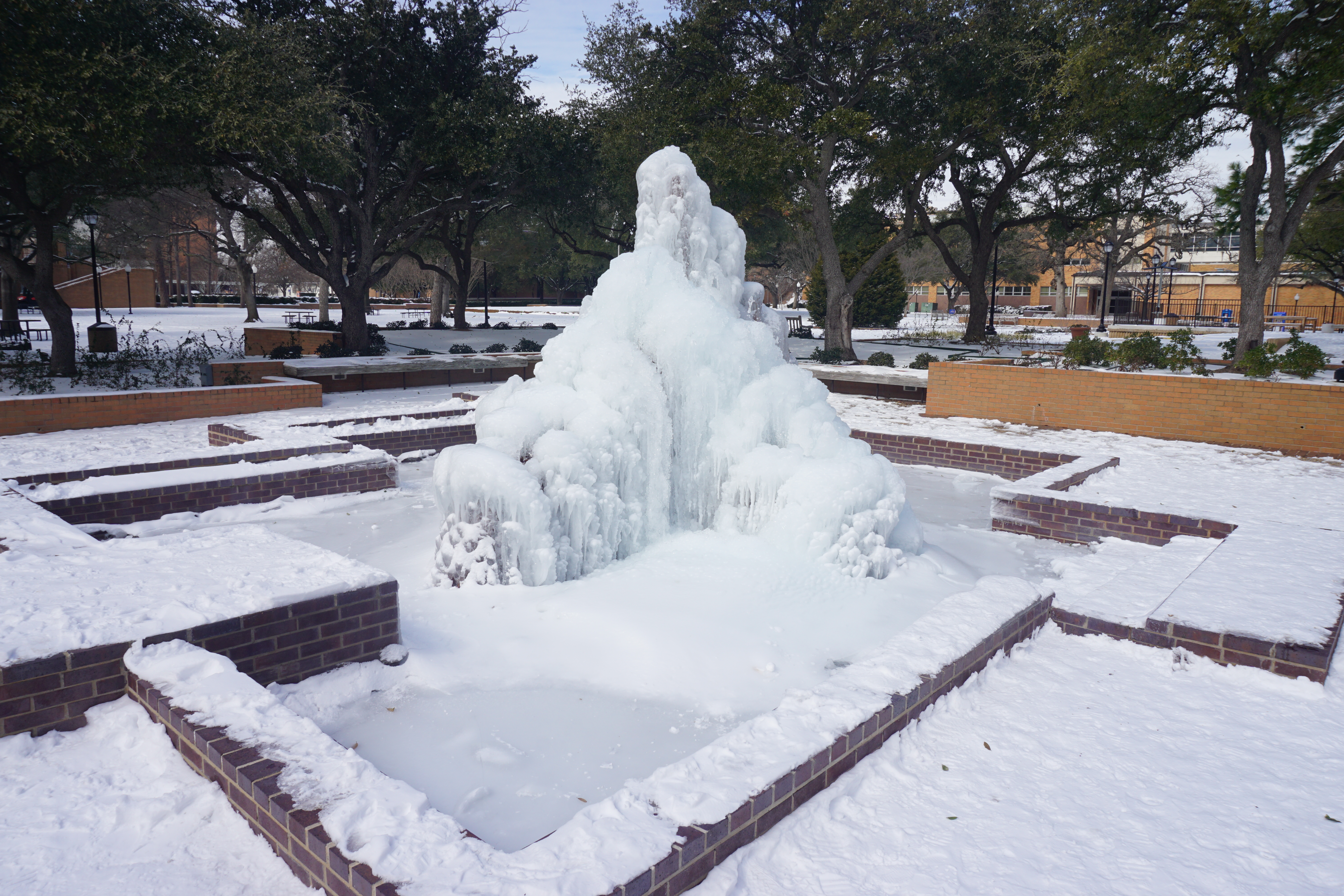
A frozen fountain on campus during the 2021 power crisis

State and federal legislation and events are impacting higher education, including UTA. On June 11, 2020, UTA's African American Faculty and Staff Association, Center for African American Studies, and Multicultural Affairs office collaborated to host a virtual town hall meeting about systemic racism on campus after the murder of George Floyd and widespread protests in response. On July 9, Lim announced eight UTA initiatives to address systemic racism on campus; they included a new vice-president position focusing on diversity, equity, and inclusion and creating a Diversity and Inclusion Committee by fall 2020. Bryan Samuel, former Kansas State University chief diversity and inclusion officer, became vice president for diversity, equity and inclusion in March 2021. In May of that year, Davis Hall was renamed the University Administration Building; it had been named for former university administrator and eugenics advocate Edward E. Davis. By 2021, UTA's undergraduate population has been at least 30% Hispanic, and in that same year only 6% of UTA's faculty was Hispanic. In 2022 UTA and 19 other universities formed the Alliance of Hispanic Serving Research Universities, with a key goal being to increase the number of Hispanic professors.

For the fall 2020 semester, UTA made standardized test scores optional for undergraduate admissions and scholarship applications. It enrolled its largest freshman class, 3,820 students. In February 2021, UTA closed for a week during the Texas power crisis. It became the fourth university to achieve Texas Tier One status in August, joining Texas Tech, the University of Houston, and UTD. The designation recognized UTA as an "emerging research university" and gave it access to the state's annual $6.2 million National Research University Fund. UTA established a Blaze Forward program in March 2022, which began paying tuition and fees for full-time undergraduates who were Texas residents and had a family income of $85,000 or less starting in fall 2022.

From March 24 to April 6, 2022, UTA's student government was accused of racism, sexism and transphobia. The student government president, vice president and chief of staff were impeached for alleged misconduct and failure to perform the duties of office. Student organizations, including the Black Students Association, NAACP, Progressive Student Union, Gender Sexuality Alliance and the EXCEL Office, called for their resignations and organized a March 28 protest which included current and former student-government members. On April 4, student body president Caitlyn Burge-Surles was impeached; chief of staff Alyssa Spencer was impeached the following day. On April 6, student body vice president Thomason Clayton was acquitted. Students protested the acquittal on April 11, calling for Clayton's resignation and increased action by the university administration to combat bigotry and sexual harassment.

In May 2023, UTA alumnus Kelcy Warren donated the largest single philanthropic investment in UTA's history. He donated $12 million to grow the resource and energy engineering programs at UTA.

== Building and campus development ==
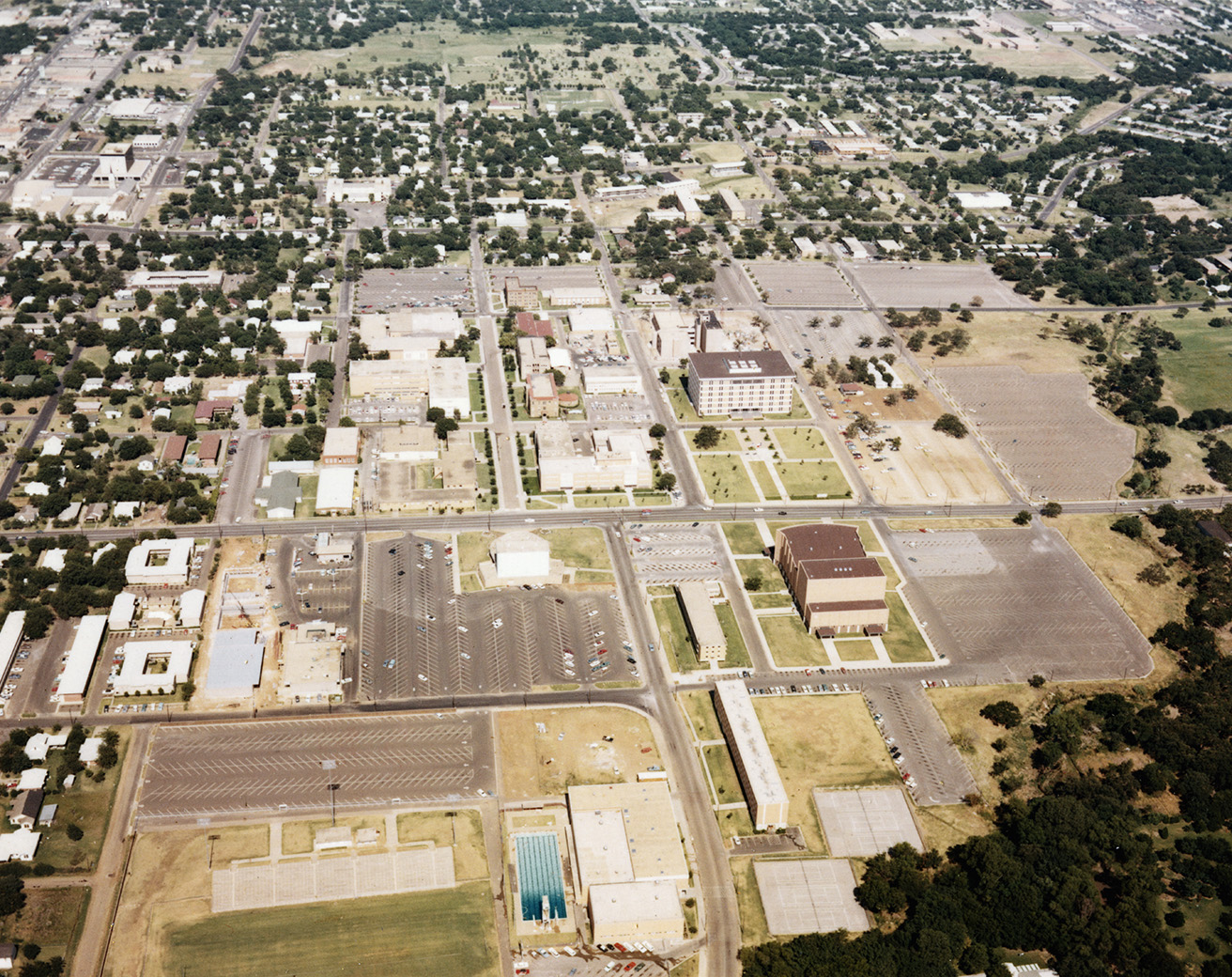
Arlington State College aerial view, circa 1967

During the mid-1960s, ASC built a new student health center, completed an addition to its student center, built an auditorium and a theater, upgraded its physical education building, and expanded campus parking. The college's main campus covered 130 acres (53 ha), and it owned another 100 acres (40 ha) of former farmland west of the main campus. In 1967, UTA's Central Library (built with two stories in 1964) was expanded to six stories; The $12.1 million cost was primarily funded by the UT system. Also shortly after ASC joined the UT System, the system allocated $1.4 million for a mathematics and languages building and $350,000 for an addition to its men's physical education building. Joining the UT system prompted ASC to revise its master plan, which had been drafted in 1960. The updated master plan emphasized making the campus more walkable by turning streets into pedestrian malls, and recommended a compact campus with low-rise buildings. The plan considered the new library and Texas Hall as the campus' main axis and recommended developing its southern edge, where it bordered Mitchell Street, into a "beauty spot".

A number of new buildings were constructed during President Harrison's tenure from 1968 to 1972, including Hammond Hall and Trimble Hall (1968), Carlisle Hall (1969), the Business-Life Science Building and University Hall (1970), and Davis Hall (1971). Construction began on the $8 million Fine Arts Building in 1972. By that year, the campus covered 197 acres (80 ha). An early-1970s self-study report first mentioned a plan to lower Cooper Street, which carries Farm to Market Road 157 through the campus. UTA, Texas and the city of Arlington collaborated to lower Cooper Street and build pedestrian bridges in November 1990, after wheelchair athlete Andrew David Beck was struck and killed crossing the road in January 1989.

UTA failed to receive funding in 1977 for a 10,000-seat, $14 million special-events center for basketball and volleyball; the center was never built. The College of Business Administration building was dedicated the following year. In 1982, UTA received funding for its Architecture Building and a thermal energy building. Two years later, UTA and the other universities in the UT and A&M Systems received access to the Permanent University Fund for classroom- and research-building construction.

Eighty-five buildings were on the UTA campus in 1986, with a total value of $238 million; the campus had expanded to 348 acres (141 ha). The Automation and Robotics Research Institute opened as a satellite campus at River Bend in Fort Worth the following year, in partnership with the Fort Worth Chamber Foundation. Saxon considered it among the most notable campus additions during the Nedderman era. UTA opened a $39.9 million engineering complex in 1989. In 1991, the Engineering II building was renamed Nedderman Hall. Total campus construction costs during Nedderman's tenure (1972–1992) were over $158 million.

UTA unveiled a 20-year master plan in October 1999, the school's first master plan in 33 years. Highlights included 22 new buildings, a main entrance at the intersection of Border and College Streets, and the conversion of several campus streets to pedestrian walkways. Pachl Hall, a 52-year-old residence hall, was demolished in January 2001. A new residence hall, Kalpana Chawla Hall was dedicated three years later. In 2005, the city of Arlington and UTA unsuccessfully bid for the George W. Bush Presidential Library.

The 128,000-square-foot (11,900 m^{2}) Chemistry and Physics Building, with laboratories and a planetarium, opened in January 2006. That year, the university redeveloped a section of West Street on campus into a pedestrian mall. In 2007, UTA purchased the Coronado Apartments and Hamilton House on the eastern edge of campus to demolish them and convert their 2.5 acres (1.0 ha) into green space. In October and November 2008, the university demolished the Coronado Apartments to replace it with a landscaped park and trail as part of Arlington's Center Street Pedestrian Trail.

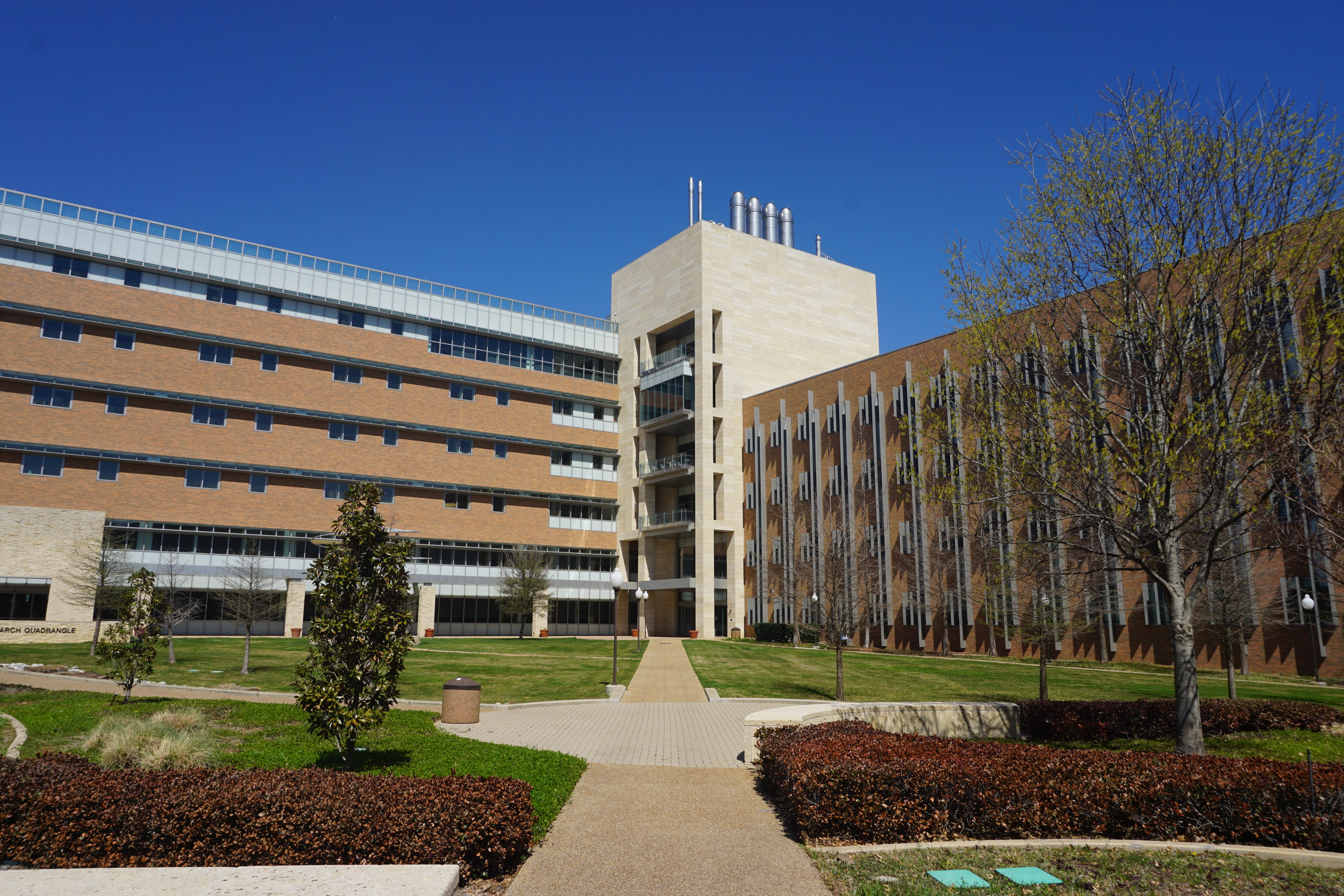
Greene Research Quad and the Engineering Research Building, 2021

The Smart Hospital, a nursing facility with manikins able to simulate bleeding, breathing complications and childbirth, opened in August 2007. The Maverick Activities Center (MAC), a campus recreation facility, opened the following month. UTA installed the metroplex's first green roof on the Life Science Building in April 2008, and the Engineering Research Complex became the first certified LEED building on campus in September of that year. In November 2009, UTA announced that it would be tobacco-free by August 2011.

UTA's Engineering Research Building opened in January 2011. The university opened College Park Green, a park in the College Park district on the eastern edge of campus, in April of that year. In August, UTA built a landmark 35-foot (11 m) tower at the corner of UTA Boulevard and South Cooper Street with funds left over from construction of the Engineering Research Building. The College Park Center, home to events and UTA's men's basketball, women's basketball and women's volleyball teams, opened in February 2012. In April of that year, the university purchased the Johnson Creek Crossing Apartments on South Pecan Street and renamed it The Heights on Pecan. The building provided about 300 additional rooms of on-campus housing.

In spring 2018, UTA opened a new parking garage on the west side of campus. Eighty-two-year-old Brazos Hall, the school's smallest and oldest dormitory, was demolished in July of that year; Brazos Park, on its site, opened in August 2019. The Commons, a dining facility on the west campus, and the West Hall dormitory opened in August 2018. The following month, UTA opened the Science and Engineering Innovation and Research (SEIR) Building. It acquired the Centennial Court apartments in February 2019, integrating them into the school's University Housing department. The university opened its Military and Veteran Services (MAVS) Center the following month.

The UT System Board of Regents allocated $60 million for a new building for the UTA School of Social Work in November 2019; President Karbhari had addressed the 86th Texas Legislature in February about the state of the existing Social Work facility, which was built in 1922. The building opened in January 2023, and the International Nursing Association for Clinical Simulation and Learning endorsed the facility. In 2019, UTA demolished its Maple Square and Garden Club apartments; both were built in 1964, and had reached the end of their useful lives. Trinity House, a residence hall on the west side of campus, was demolished in December 2019. In September 2020, UTA opened its "grand entrance" addition to the University Center which completed a $9.8 million expansion project. As part of its preparations for the 2024 solar eclipse, UTA upgraded its technology inside the planetarium to provide better visualizations of stars and planets.

== Student life ==
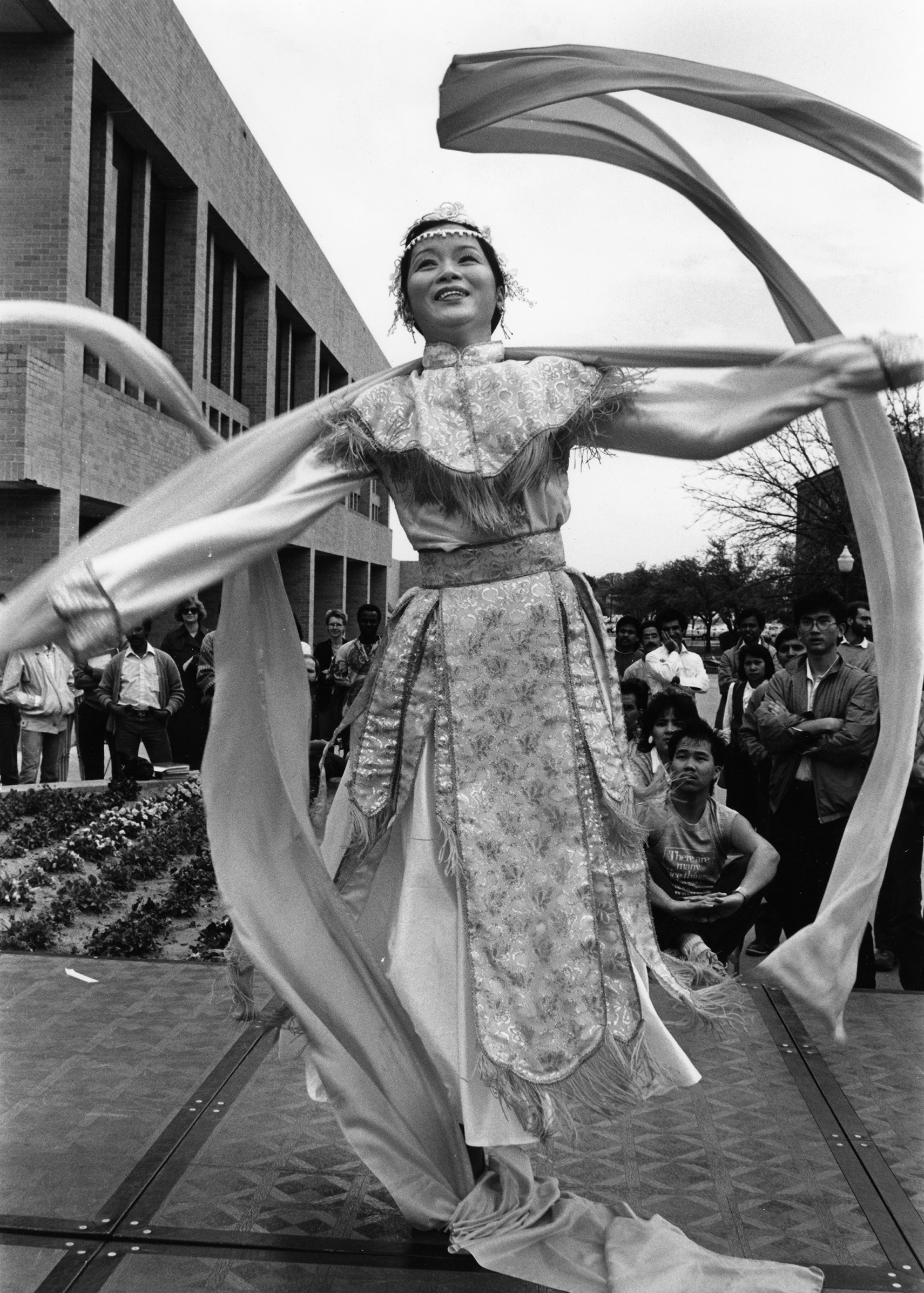
A dancer in costume during UTA's 1987 International Week

Ninety-one student clubs and organizations were active on campus by the end of the ASC era in 1967, more than four times the 1957 number. UTA was not a center of student protest during the 1960s and 1970s, although smaller protests for and against the Vietnam War, against the Mideast policy of President Jimmy Carter, against the construction of the Comanche Peak Nuclear Power Plant in Glen Rose, and against those responsible for the Iran hostage crisis. The Ku Klux Klan staged a protest on campus during a speech by Alex Haley.

UTA hosted an Urban Survival Fair in September 1975, its largest event, with 65,000–70,000 attendees. Co-sponsored by its Institute of Urban Studies and Dallas radio station KZEW, the fair had live music and 85 booths which distributed information about art, education, and social-service organizations. UTA has celebrated International Week since 1977, featuring the customs, dance, fashions, and food of UTA's international students.

One of the school's most enduring traditions since 1980 has been bed racing at Maverick Stadium, using wheel-mounted bed frames with mattresses. Since 1981, UTA has held an Activity Fair to welcome students to campus and connect them with leadership and volunteer opportunities. The fair is currently held in conjunction with the Maverick Cookout, at which university faculty and staff serve burgers and drinks to students as part of the Maverick Stampede series of events introducing students to campus and to each other. Since 1989, students, faculty, staff, and alumni have competed annually in oozeball, a mud-volleyball competition whose proceeds help fund scholarships.

In 1985, UTA's practice of occasionally screening X-rated films on campus resulted in controversy when Baptist Student Union president Greg Sullivan protested the showing of Emmanuelle 2 and Story of O. State Senator Robert McFarland and Representative Jan McKenna, both representing Arlington, also expressed anger at the practice and threatened to withhold state funding from the university. President Nedderman implemented a policy banning X-rated films with "strong sexual content" unless they were screened for a "legitimate academic or educational program". The policy was criticized as "an arbitrary kind of standard" by the Fort Worth chapter of the American Civil Liberties Union and, according to a Shorthorn poll, was opposed by 87 percent of the student body.

After UTA's football program ended in 1985, homecoming was moved from football season in the fall to the spring basketball season. In 2012, homecoming returned to the fall. From 1989 to 2006, every student in UTA's engineering program had their nation's flag displayed in Nedderman Hall. In 2006, President James Spaniolo removed all flags from the Hall of Flags after protests by the local Vietnamese-American community against the inclusion of the flag of Vietnam and not the flag of South Vietnam. Spaniolo's decision ended the 17-year existence of the Hall of Flags, and he said at a forum in June of that year that flags would not return to Nedderman Hall in the foreseeable future.

In February 1991, a pro-Operation Desert Storm rally was held on UTA's Library Mall after the beginning of the Gulf War. Likewise, during the Iraq War there were several protests and rallies led by Students for a Just Peace against the war. The university declared Fridays "Spirit Days" in September 2005, encouraging students, faculty, and staff to wear UTA apparel on Fridays. Industrial and organizational psychology major Erin Porche started Natural Kinks, a natural hair club, on campus in spring 2016.

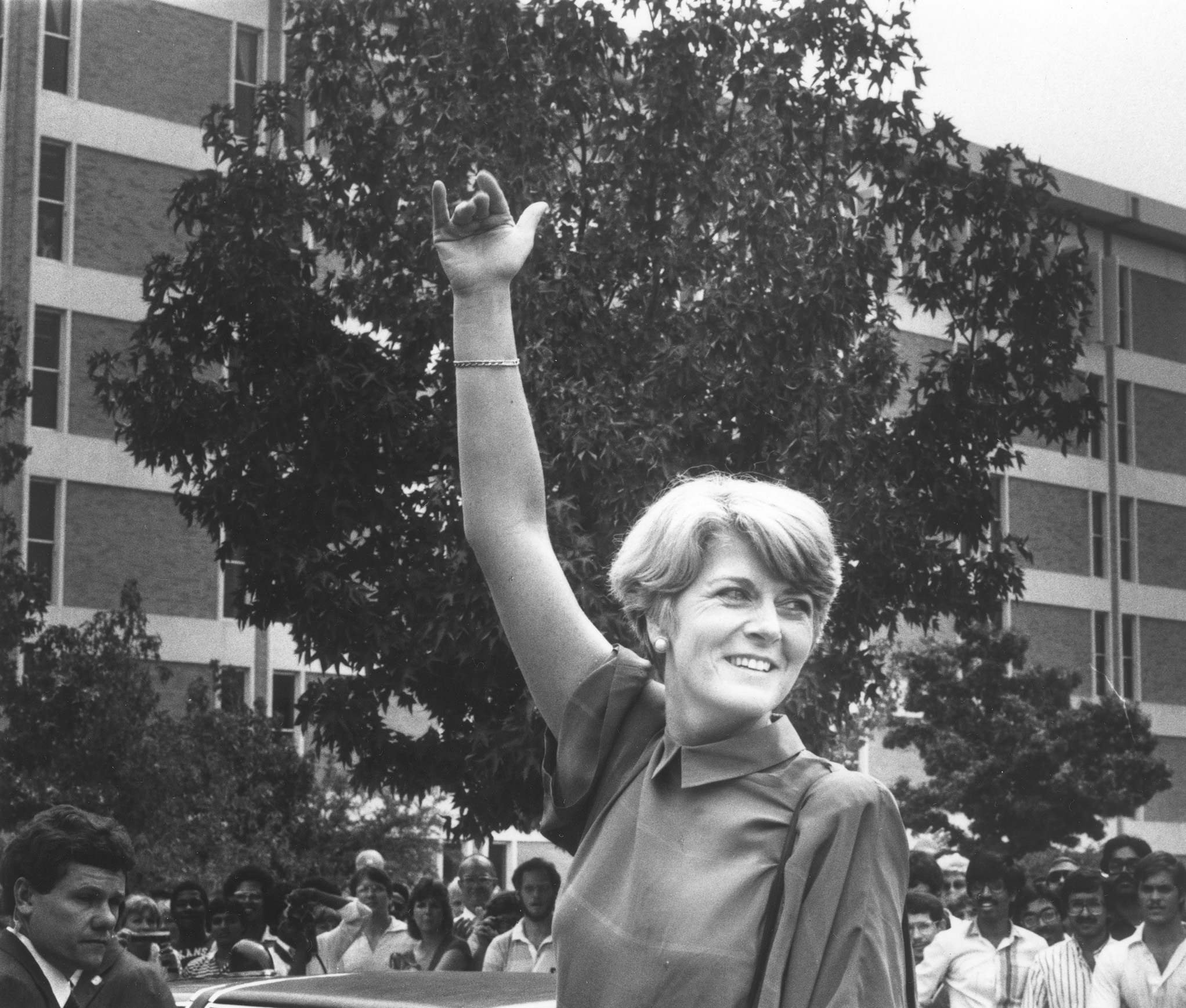
Geraldine Ferraro on campus in 1984

In February 2018, UTA's chapter of Phi Gamma Delta was suspended for three years after an investigation. The school suspended campus fraternity and sorority activities in April 2019 due to "concerns regarding the culture of the fraternal community both at UTA and nationally". President Karbarhari said that the decision was made because of "cases of hazing, sexual assault, extreme intoxication, and other inappropriate behaviors connected to some members of our Greek Community". UTA allowed fraternities and sororities to resume operation in August of that year after each met new requirements, which included more training and limits on alcohol at events.

Among notable UTA guest speakers were Jane Fonda in 1970 and vice-presidential candidate Geraldine Ferraro in 1984. In 1975, country musician Willie Nelson played a benefit concert for UTA's athletic department. Pakistani prime minister Benazir Bhutto spoke on campus in 2007.

It is considered good luck to rub the head of the bronze bust of former president E. H. Hereford, which is on display in the Hereford University Center, although there has been controversy regarding Hereford on allegations of racism. Another legend concerns a white elephant which is reputedly buried on campus. According to former UTA professor John D. Boon, paleontology professor C. L. McNulty needed to create a collection of vertebrate skeletal elements. To accomplish this, UTA's biology and paleontology departments bought the skeleton of an elephant named "Queen Tut" (who lived at the Fort Worth Zoo) from the Fort Worth Rendering Company for $24. To clean the skeleton, it was buried in a parking lot near Maverick Stadium; exhumed several years later, it was added to the UTA Geology Department collection. A second elephant skeleton, purchased by the university, was cured on the roof of the Science Building instead of being buried.

=== Notable alumni ===
In 1971, Tommy Franks graduated from UTA with a degree in business. After serving in the Vietnam and Gulf Wars, he rose to the rank of general before leading the American invasions of Afghanistan in 2001 and Iraq in 2003. Kalpana Chawla graduated from UTA in 1984 with a master's degree in aerospace engineering. In 1997, she became the first Indian woman to fly into space aboard the Space Shuttle Columbia. Chawla was killed on the Columbia in 2003 when it disintegrated during reentry, and UTA named both a residence hall and a scholarship in her memory. Actor Lou Diamond Phillips also graduated from UTA in 1984.

== University of Texas at Arlington Rebel theme controversy ==
The University of Texas at Arlington (UTA) inherited a theme, including a nickname and mascot, of "Rebels" from its days as Arlington State College (ASC). The theme dated back to 1951, but after the integration of the school in 1962 and its admission into the University of Texas System (UT System) in 1965, The Shorthorn student newspaper editorialized that it should be changed. Throughout the 1960s, editorials were written, protests were made, and referendums were held on the Rebel theme. However, with university president Frank Harrison consistently putting the decision fully in the control of UTA students, the student body repeatedly voted against changing the theme.

In 1969–70, a referendum on a replacement theme selected "Mavericks", but it did not defeat "Rebels" in a referendum to change the theme in March 1970. Ultimately, the UT System Board of Regents grew tired of the controversy and voted to abolish UTA's Rebel theme by a vote of seven to two in January 1971. After multiple votes and runoffs, the UTA student body finally selected "Mavericks" as the university's new theme in April 1971.

=== Background ===
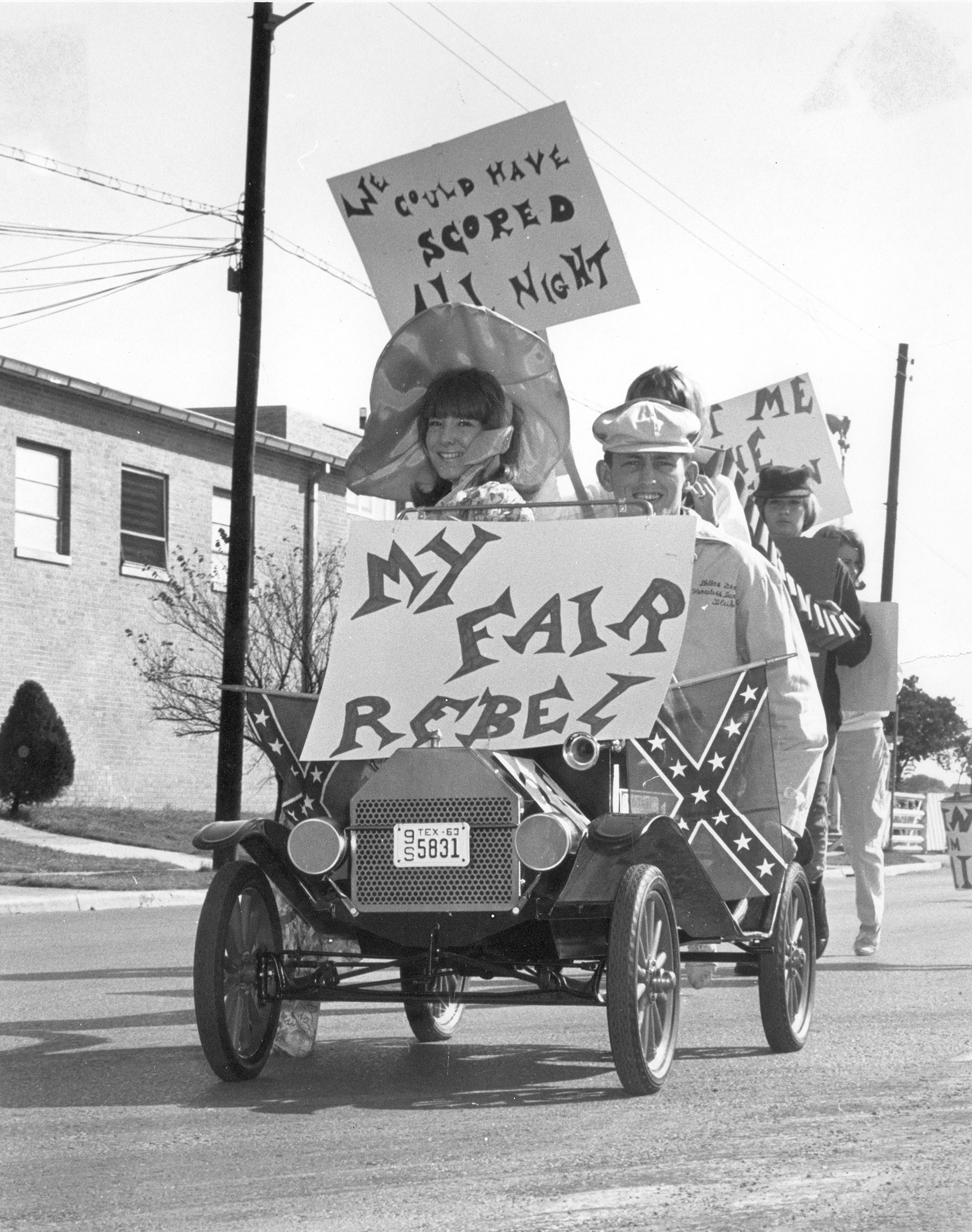
Rebel-themed car, presumably in an ASC homecoming parade, undated

The University of Texas at Arlington (UTA) inherited a theme, including a nickname and mascot, of "Rebels" from its days as Arlington State College (ASC). ASC had been the Rebels since a fall 1951 assembly at which students voted for it over "Cadets". The Rebel theme replaced "Blue Riders", which had been adopted in 1949 and perceived by ASC president Ernest H. Hereford as lackluster. The Rebel theme also included more tangential elements, such as the use of the Confederate flag and the playing of "Dixie" as the college's unofficial fight song. In the 1960s, ASC had a mascot named "Johnny Reb", who was elected by the student body alongside a "Miss Dixie Bell". The students also selected a "Mr. and Mrs. Rebel Spirit" each year. ASC had additionally named rooms in its student center after Confederate leaders such as Robert E. Lee and J. E. B. Stuart, while homecoming was observed as "Old South Week" and included mock slave auctions.

=== Early debate over the Rebel theme to the first referendum (1962–68) ===
The Shorthorn student newspaper first editorialized that the Rebel theme should be changed after the integration of the school in 1962, and then made the same case after its admission into the University of Texas System (UT System) in 1965. In May 1965, the ASC student government held a referendum that resulted in 2,429 votes to keep the "Rebels" theme and only 448 to change. In response to the result, African American students organized a peaceful protest of the university's use of the Confederate flag in October 1965. In fall 1967, African American student Frank Wyman published an essay in the Arlington Review arguing that the same symbol could be viewed very differently by different groups, noting that the Confederate flag symbolized independence and states' rights for some white students while it also represented slavery and racism for African Americans. In spring 1968, The Shorthorn again editorialized that the Rebel theme should be changed, while 70 African American students petitioned ASC's student government to act for change.

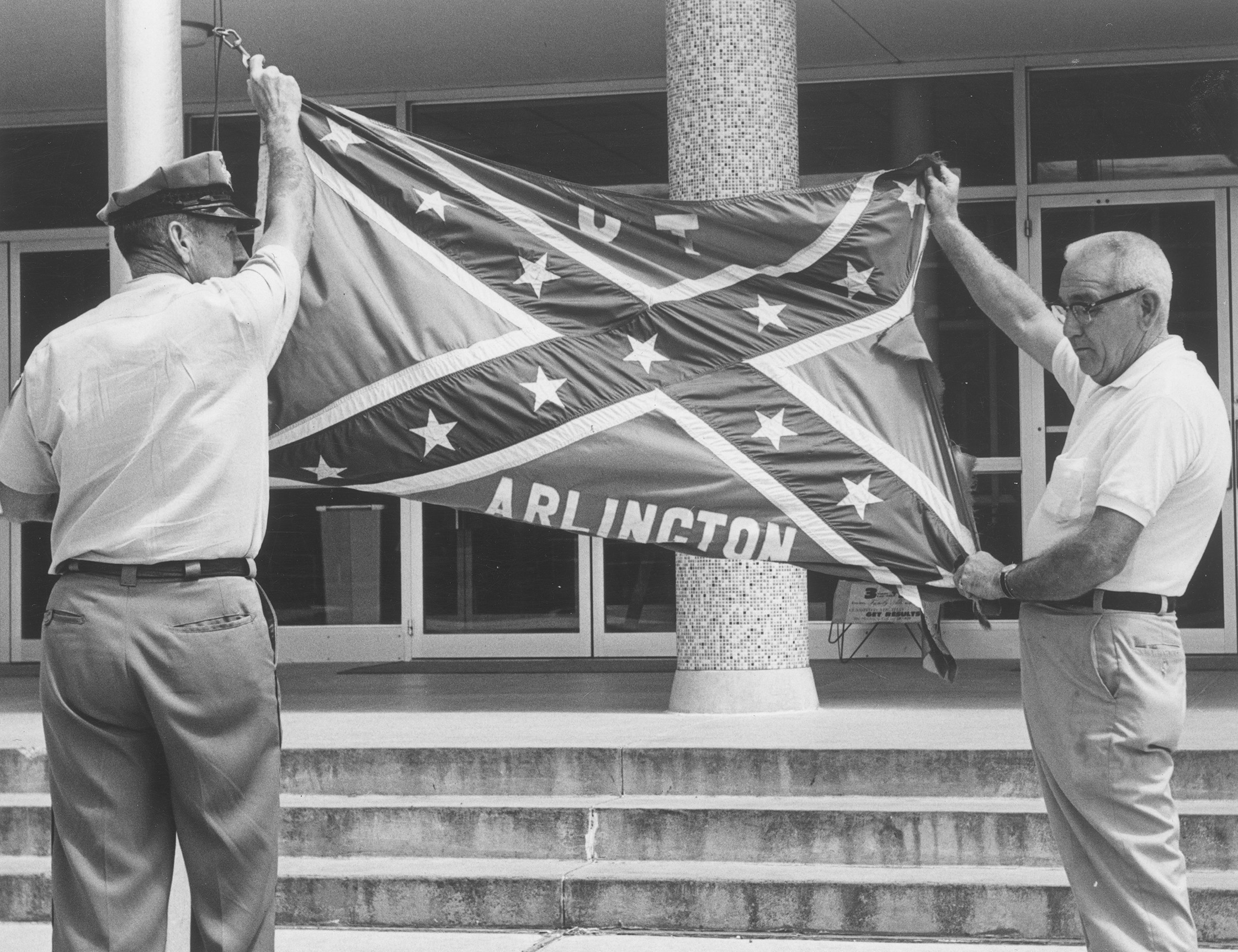
UTA's Confederate flag is taken down for the last time, 1968

In April 1968, the Student Congress voted to remove the university's Confederate flag, which previously had flown over the student center, by July 1, 1968. This decision was unpopular with a majority of the student body, however, and supporters of the Rebel theme conducted a petition drive that garnered 4,000 signatures and a promise from university president Jack Woolf that only a student referendum could change the university's theme. On November 25, 1968, Shorthorn student editor Donna Darovich editorialized, "What happened 104 years ago is neither the fault nor the responsibility of the students at UT Arlington, and when those students wave their flags, prejudice and the Civil War are not what they are upholding. You can't change the past by changing the present." Printed in the same issue of The Shorthorn was a countering editorial by Student Congress president Jeff Hensley, who wrote, "I became convinced the Confederate theme was sufficiently offensive to significant numbers of students to justify removal. The most important consideration is the personal offense which the Confederate theme inflicts on the Negro student." The first referendum on the theme was held in November 1968, resulting in 3,507 votes in favor of keeping the "Rebels" theme and only 952 in favor of changing it. The referendum also saw 36 choices for potential replacement themes, with the top three in votes being Aardvarks, Texans, and Mavericks.

=== Activism by African American students (1969) ===
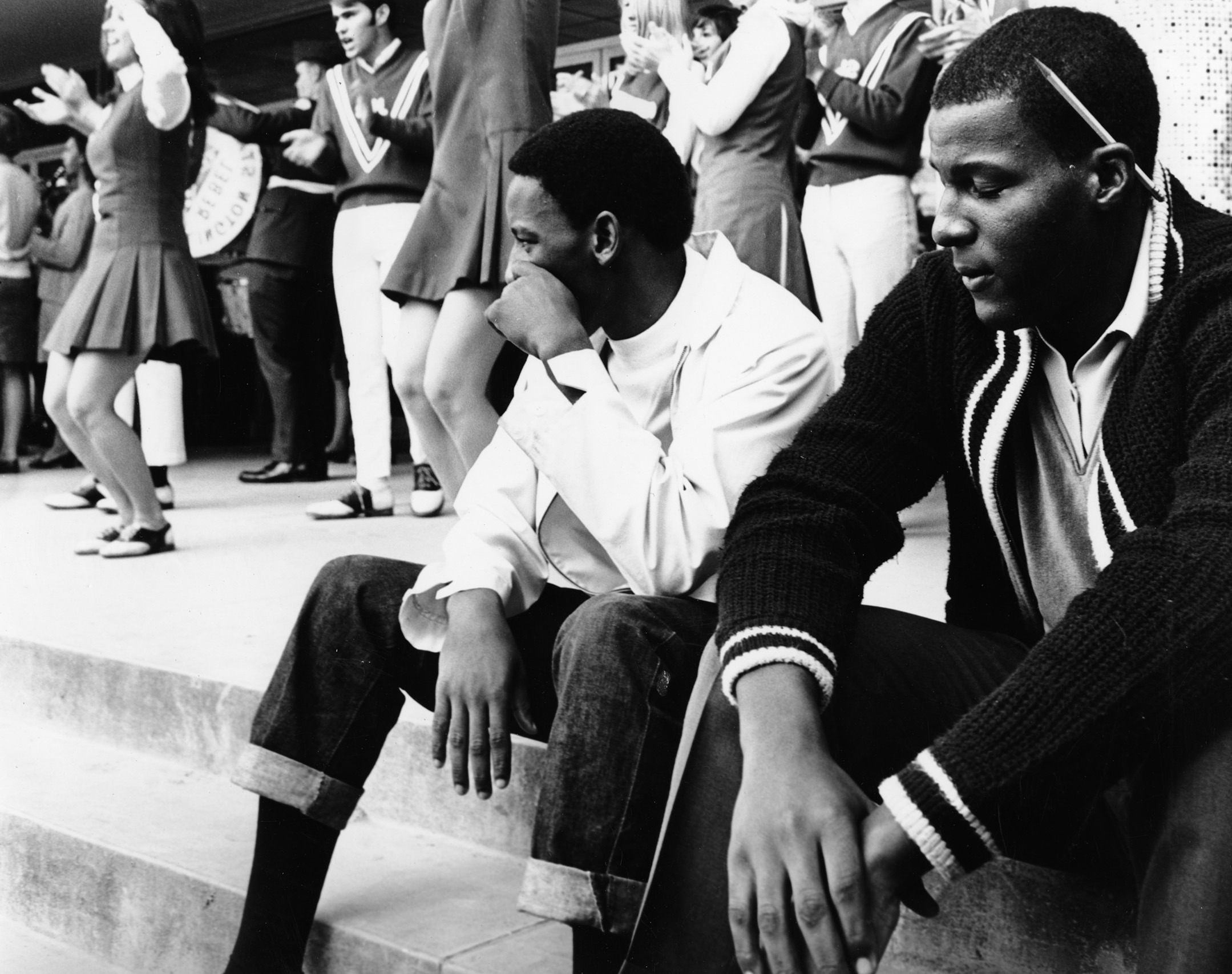
African American students watching Rebel pep rally, 1965

In spring 1969, the Collegians for Afro-American Progress (CAP) student group went to university president Frank Harrison with a list of demands, including hiring African American professors and establishing an African American studies program alongside changing the Rebel theme. However, Harrison declined or refused to address any of their demands. In October 1969, 17 African American students interrupted a pep rally seeking the removal of the Kappa Alpha Order fraternity's Confederate flag. The Kappa Alphas refused and a fight broke out. Subsequent activism included the burning of Confederate flags by protestors and an unsuccessful attempt by a group of African American students to enter the press box at a UTA football game in an effort to address the crowd.

=== Action by administration and additional referendums (1969–70) ===
While it publicly expressed support for changing the Rebel theme, the UTA administration and President Harrison consistently put the decision fully in the control of UTA students. The president's Executive Committee, the UTA Faculty Council, and the statewide Texas Intercollegiate Student Association all came out against the Rebel theme. However, multiple votes conducted by the student body failed to abolish the Rebel theme nor did they suggest an alternative. In December 1969, a student vote on an alternate theme finished with 2,330 votes for "Texans", 2,229 for "Mavericks", and 1,199 for "Apollos". Due to the close nature of the vote, a runoff was held in February 1970, turnout was poor as only 318 voted for "Mavericks" and just 174 for "Texans". In March 1970, another referendum pitted "Rebels" against "Mavericks", with a closer result but still victory for the incumbent theme: 2,198 votes for "Rebels" and 1,755 for "Mavericks".

In fall 1970, President Harrison successfully convinced the UTA marching band to stop playing "Dixie" at football games and stop wearing Confederate flags on their uniforms. Later that fall, the board of directors of the UTA Ex-Students Association voted six to five to ask UTA to resume playing "Dixie" as its fight song and fully restore Rebel-themed symbols on campus.

=== Action by the UT System Board of Regents and resolution (1971) ===
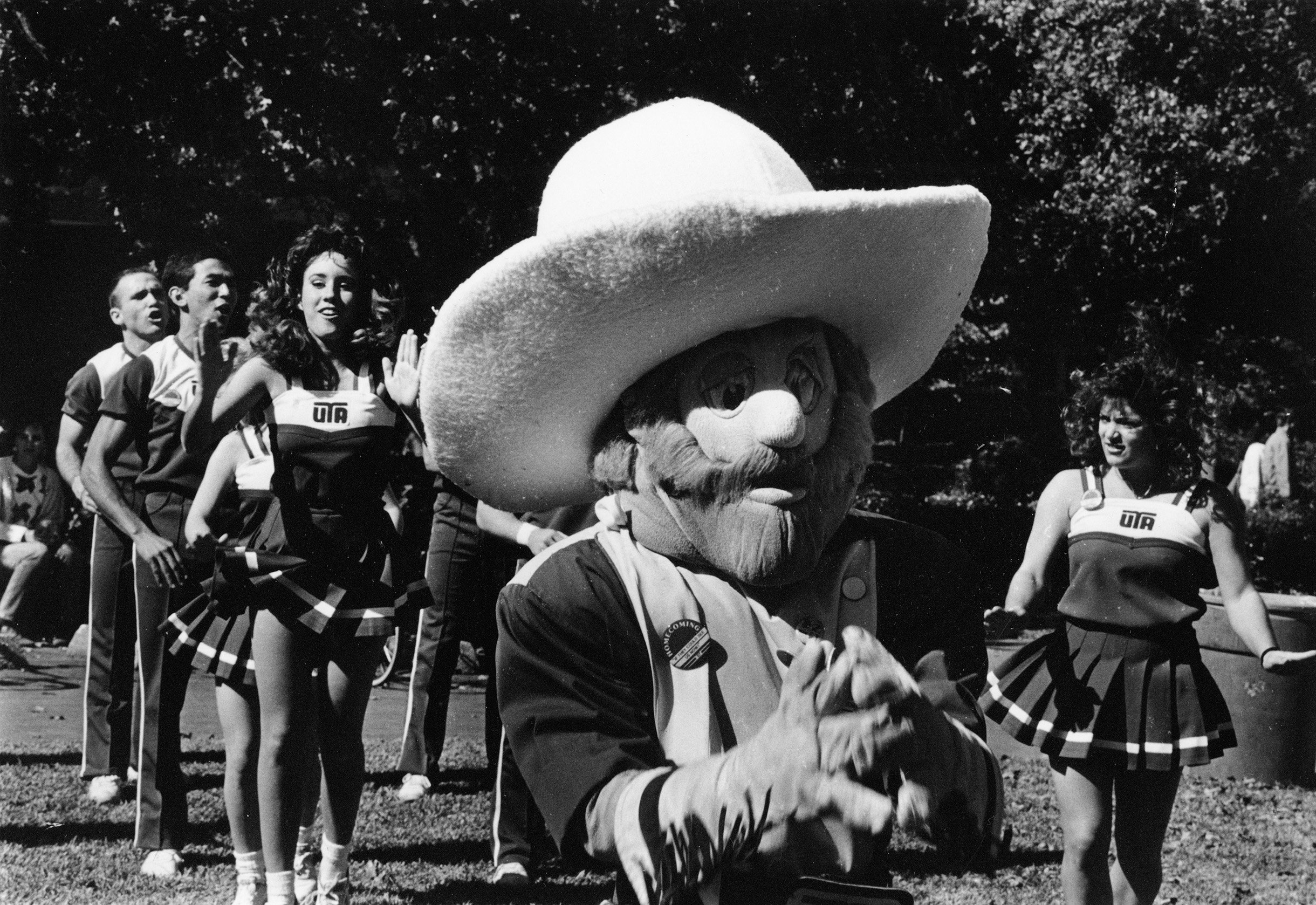
UTA's Sam Maverick mascot, 1987

Ultimately, the UT System Board of Regents grew tired of the controversy and voted to abolish UTA's Rebel theme by a vote of seven to two in January 1971. In the words of UT System chancellor Charles LeMaistre, the Rebel theme had caused "discord and contention" and "adversely affected the morale" at UTA. The regents then asked President Harrison to hold elections for a new theme as soon as possible and have it in use by June 1, 1971. Harrison was widely criticized for advocating a change in theme before the regents and then enforcing the referendum mandated by the regents, especially after his earlier support of the students deciding the fate of the Rebel theme.

After multiple votes and runoffs, the UTA student body finally selected "Mavericks" as the university's new theme in April 1971. The final referendum in April 1971 ended in a close vote that necessitated a runoff: 460 votes for "Mavericks", 408 for "Toros", 370 for "Rangers", and 361 for "Hawks". In the runoff at the end of the semester, "Mavericks" earned 1,863 votes while "Toros" received 1,431. While "Mavericks" officially became the new nickname and mascot of UTA on June 4, 1971, many supporters of the Rebel theme had hard feelings about the whole experience, some of whom remained opposed to the change and Harrison's actions decades later. Since the adoption of "Mavericks" as UTA's new theme, its mascot and athletics logo have variously featured a horse with cattle horns, a man based loosely on the historical Texas land baron and politician Samuel Maverick, and ultimately a horse without horns.

== Athletics ==
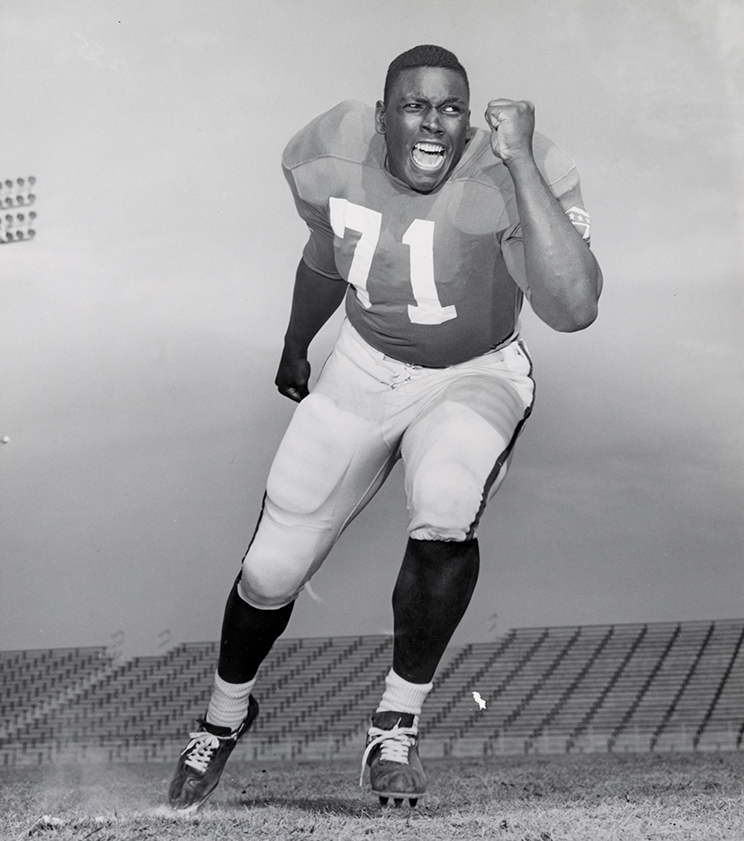
ASC football player Mel Witt, one of the first African Americans on the team, in 1966

After Memorial Stadium was demolished in 1972, the UTA football team was forced to play local high-school fields until Maverick Stadium opened in September 1980. While it never recaptured its 1950s successes and struggled on the field before lackluster crowds, the team won the 1967 Pecan Bowl and the 1981 Southland Conference (SLC) championship.

President Nedderman announced the elimination of the football program, which was losing nearly $1 million per season, in November 1985. According to Saxon, the money "could be used to further the university's primary mission of teaching and research, but instead was supporting a financially weak football program". Another reason for the program's elimination was sagging attendance, which declined from 7,950 per game in 1980 (its first year at Maverick Stadium) to 5,600 in 1985. The team had the poorest attendance of any SLC school, although UTA had the conference's largest enrollment. The football program drew funding from UTA's other athletics teams, making them less competitive. The decision to end the program was opposed by UTA's Maverick Club booster organization and community leaders, such as Tom Cravens and Tom Vandergriff; Nedderman refused to talk to the press for two weeks after the announcement. However, he received twice as many letters and calls supporting his decision than opposing.

Tim McKyer, who played on the final 1985 UTA football team, won three Super Bowls with the San Francisco 49ers and the Denver Broncos. UTA political-science professor Allan Saxe summarized his perceptions of student attitudes toward eliminating the football team: "70 percent [of UTA students] would say they are not heartbroken over dropping football. 10 percent are heartbroken, and the remaining 20 percent did not know UTA even had a team." UTA also eliminated its swimming program by the early 1980s. In 2015, UTA was the only college in the country with a marching band but no football team.

Between 1965 and the opening of College Park Center in 2012, UTA's basketball and volleyball teams played at Texas Hall: a multipurpose auditorium for concerts, plays and athletics. On February 1, 2012, College Park Center (home of UTA's men's and women's basketball and women's volleyball teams) opened with a basketball doubleheader against the University of Texas at San Antonio. The arena has also hosted professional boxing and wrestling. After gaining approval from the UT System Board of Regents to lease the arena, College Park Center became the new home of the Women's National Basketball Association (WNBA)'s Dallas Wings after the team relocated from Tulsa in 2016.

On July 1, 2012, UTA left the SLC and joined the Western Athletic Conference (WAC). It was in the WAC for a year, leaving it for the Sun Belt Conference (SBC) on July 1, 2013. UTA announced in January 2022 that it would leave the SBC no later than summer 2023, largely due to the school's lack of a football program and the conference's emphasis on football. Later that month, it announced that it would rejoin the WAC on July 1, 2022.

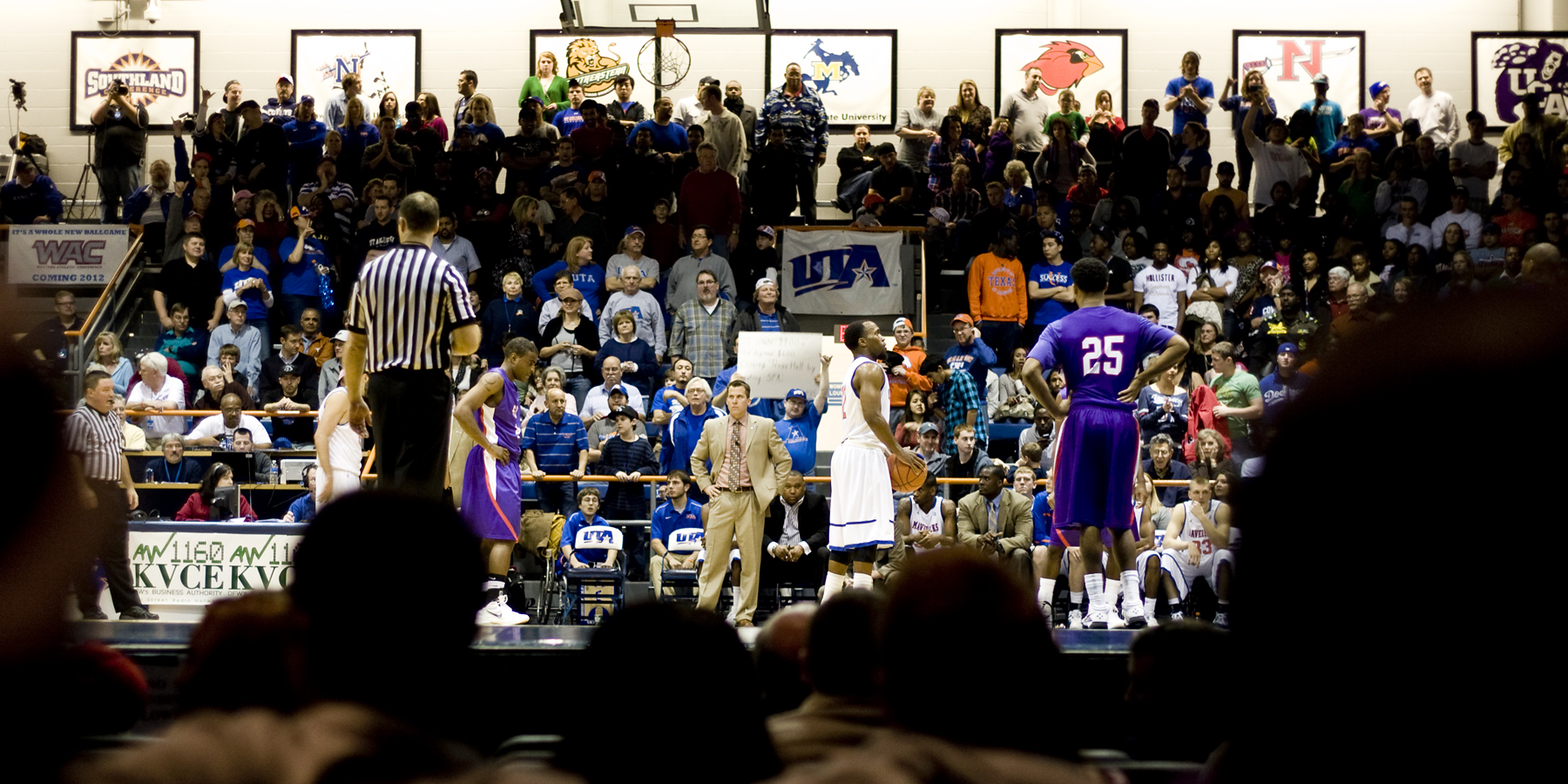
Final men's basketball game at Texas Hall, view from the floor in 2012

In 1973, after the passage of Title IX of the 1972 Educational Amendments Act, UTA began sponsoring four women's sports: basketball, softball, track, and volleyball. It was the first year that women's athletics had a line item in the university budget. During the 1980s, these four sports remained the four options for women's intercollegiate athletics; men's teams were fielded in baseball, basketball, golf, tennis, and track. Cross-country and tennis have been added as women's sports. The Dallas Morning News investigated the impact of cutting football on UTA's remaining sports in 1990, finding that their competitiveness had improved without football. Conference championships were won by softball in 1988, men's track and field in 1988 and 1989, and women's volleyball in 1990; the volleyball team had a 54-game conference winning streak through that year.

The men's basketball team qualified for the NCAA Division I tournament in 2008. The 2007–08 team won the SLC championship for the first time in program history, winning a record 21 games and qualifying for the NCAA tournament. Seeded 16th in the tournament, they were defeated 87–63 by #1 seed Memphis in their first NCAA tournament game. The 2011–12 team won the SLC regular-season championship, and the 2016–17 team won the SBC regular-season championship.

The women's basketball team qualified for the NCAA Division I tournament in 2005, 2007, and 2022. The 2004–05 women's basketball team qualified for the NCAA tournament for the first time in its history after winning the SLC title game against Louisiana–Monroe. Seeded 13th in the tournament, they lost their first-round game against #4 seed Texas Tech 69–49 at Reunion Arena in Dallas. In 2006–07, the women's basketball team set a program record for wins in a season (24), were undefeated in SLC play, and appeared in their second NCAA tournament in three seasons. The 2018–19 women's basketball team won the regular-season SBC title; the 2021–22 team won the SBC tournament championship, losing to Iowa State in the first round of the NCAA tournament.

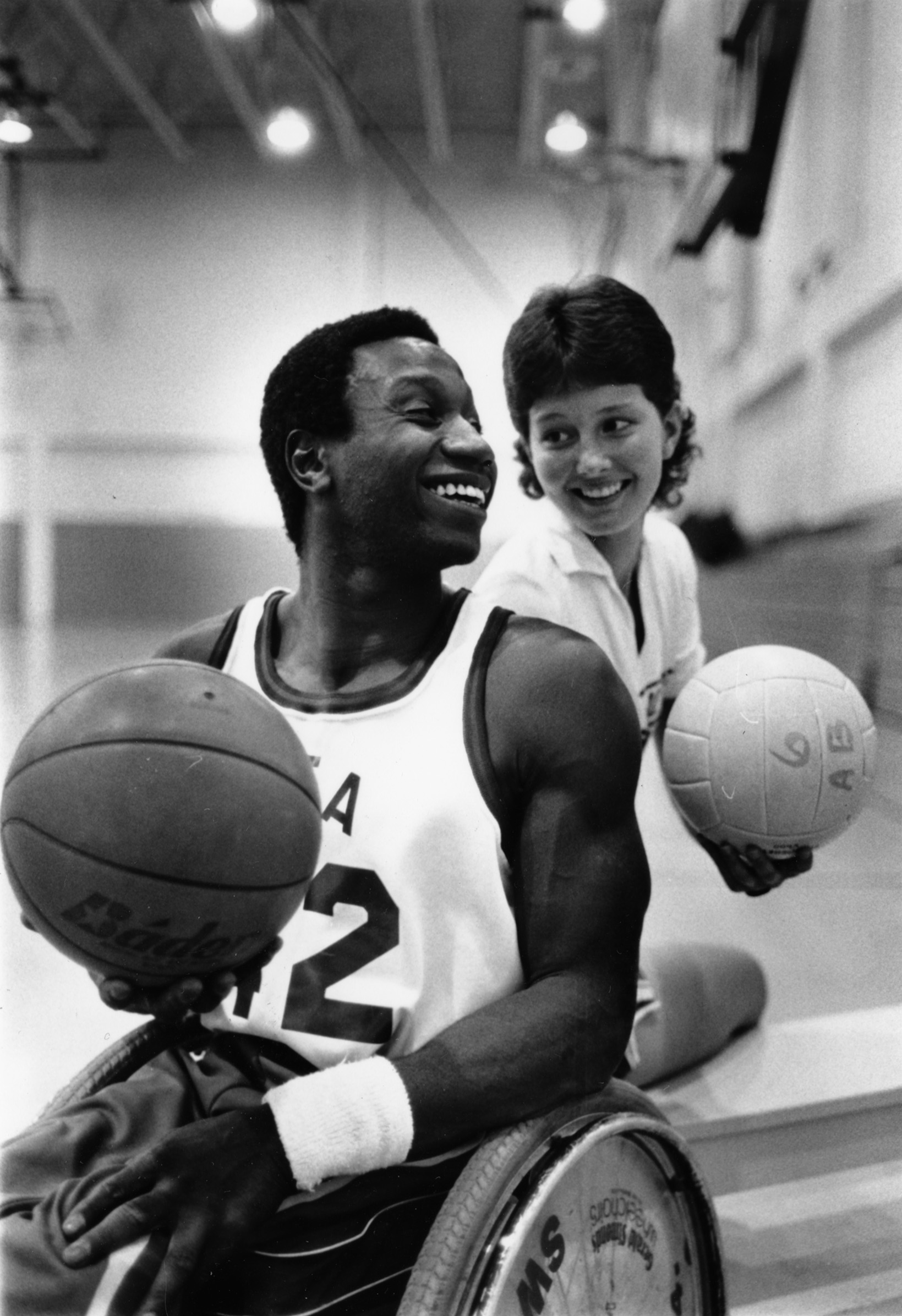
UTA Freewheelers wheelchair basketball player Abu Yilla and UTA volleyball player Judith McGill in 1985

The volleyball team advanced to the Final Four in the 1989 NCAA Division I women's volleyball tournament, defeating the national-champion Texas Longhorns en route to the Final Four in Hawaii (where they lost to eventual national champions Long Beach State). UTA's volleyball program won SLC titles in 1982, 1985, 1986, 1987, 1988, 1989, 1990, and 1992.

The baseball team won its first SLC championship in 1990, defeating Sam Houston State. It won another conference title in 1992. Clay Gould was the 1993 SLC Player of the Year. In 1999, when head coach Butch McBroom retired after leading the team since 1974, Gould was named head coach at the age of 27. After being diagnosed with colon cancer in 2000, Gould continued to coach until the end of the season. He died from the disease in June 2001, and UTA's baseball field was renamed Clay Gould Ballpark in April 2003. In June 2004, UTA baseball player Hunter Pence was selected 64th overall in the 2004 Major League Baseball draft by the Houston Astros; Pence was the highest draft pick in UTA baseball history. The 2006 team won the SLC tournament championship, and qualified for the NCAA tournament. The 2012 team again won the SLC tournament, qualifying for the NCAA tournament. The softball team won SLC championships In 1986 and 1989.

In 1986 and 1991, the women's cross-country team won conference championships. The men's track and field team won outdoor conference championships in 1989, 1990, 1991 and 1992, and indoor championships in 1990, 1991, and 1992. The men's cross-country team won the WAC championship in October 2012. The men's track and field team won the indoor SBC title in February 2014, and the outdoor conference championship in May of that year. It won the 2017 SBC Outdoor Track and Field Championships in May 2017, and the indoor championship in February 2019. The women's track and field team won the SBC conference championship in November 2014. The men's cross-country team won the SBC conference title in the fall of 2015 and 2016. In June 2018, high jumper Alexus Henry won the national championship at the NCAA Division I Outdoor Track and Field Championships.

The women's tennis team has won six regular-season SLC titles, its last in 2011. The men's tennis team won the SLC championship in 2010 and the SBC championship in 2016. The men's golf team won the SLC championship in 2005 and 2011. In 2017, UTA established a women's golf program.

The Movin' Mavs men's wheelchair basketball team, established in 1976, has won ten national titles (the most recent in 2022). Founded by UTA alumnus Jim Hayes as the Freewheelers in 1976, the team joined the National Wheelchair Basketball Association in 1988 and changed its name to the Movin' Mavs. After winning its third consecutive national championship in 1993, the team was invited to the White House by President Bill Clinton. In 2002, the Movn' Mavs were the first college team to make the semifinals of the professional-division National Wheelchair Basketball Tournament. In October 2009, James Patin of the Movin' Mavs wheelchair tennis team won a national championship, and the wheelchair tennis team won the ITA/USTA Intercollegiate Wheelchair Tennis National Team Championship in October 2014. UTA established a women's wheelchair basketball team, commonly known as the Lady Movin' Mavs, in fall 2013. They won their first NWBA National Intercollegiate Wheelchair Basketball Tournament in March 2016, and their second national championship in March 2018. Five members (or alumni) of the Movin' Mavs and Lady Movin' Mavs competed in wheelchair basketball at the 2016 Summer Paralympics: Abby Dunkin, Aaron Gouge, Rose Hollermann, Mike Paye, and Jorge Sanchez. The UTA cheer squad has won national championships in its division in 2010, 2014, 2015, 2016, 2017, and 2018.

In 1982, UTA mechanical-engineering professor Robert Woods created a Formula SAE team which designs and builds a competitive race car every year. The UTA Formula SAE team has won national and international competitions, and was ranked fifth worldwide in 2014. The team won its first international competition in September 2004, against 26 other cars in Japan. In September 2015, it won the Sports Car Club of America Nationals.

== Sources ==
- Saxon, Gerald D. (1995). Transitions: A Centennial History of the University of Texas at Arlington, 1895-1995. Arlington, Texas: UTA Press. ISBN 0932408192.
- Barker, Evelyn; Worcester, Lea (2015). University of Texas at Arlington. Charleston, South Carolina: Arcadia Publishing. ISBN 9781439649732.
