= Ryan C. Amacher =

American economics professor, dean and university president

- Born: November 9, 1945; Marshfield, Wisconsin USA
- Died: November 25, 2016; Lake Shore, Minnesota USA
- Education: Ripon College; University of Virginia
- Known for: University Administration; President University of Texas Arlington

Ryan C. Amacher (November 9, 1945 – November 25, 2016) was an American economics professor, dean and university president. During his career he was associated in various capacities with University of Virginia, General Electric Company (TEMPO, Center for Advanced Studies), the University of Oklahoma, U.S. Treasury, Arizona State University, Clemson University, and the University of Texas at Arlington.

== Biography ==
Amacher was born in 1945 in Marshfield, Wisconsin, United States. He attended elementary and high school in Medford, Wisconsin, and graduated from Ripon College (Wisconsin) in 1967 with an A.B. in economics. Amacher subsequently earned a Ph.D. from the University of Virginia in 1971.

=== Career ===
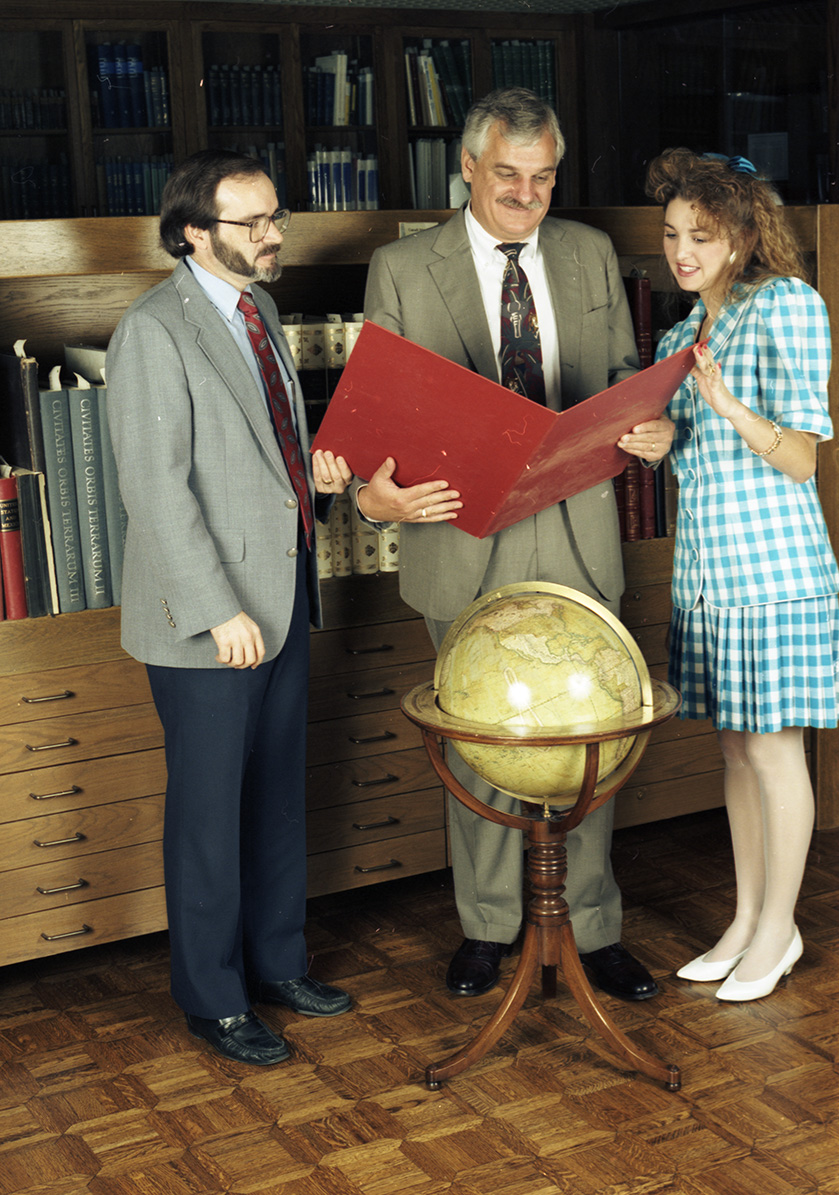
Amacher (center) as president of the University of Texas at Arlington

Amacher began teaching as an instructor, University of Virginia in 1970–1971, and after receiving his Ph.D. in economics from the University of Virginia in 1971, he joined General Electric TEMPO , Center for Advanced Studies during 1971–1972. He then served first as assistant professor then as associate professor of economics at the University of Oklahoma during 1972–1974. In 1974 he joined the U.S. Treasury serving as a senior international economist until 1975, when he left to become a professor of economics at Arizona State University, where he served until 1981. From 1977 until 1981 he was chair of the Department of Economics at Arizona State.

In 1981 Amacher became dean of the College of Commerce and Industry at Clemson University and in 1992 was selected president of the University of Texas at Arlington (UTA), a post he held until 1995 when he resigned from the presidency and returned to teaching in the Department of Economics at UTA as professor of economics and public affairs. During his career Amacher was author or co-author of a number of books including "Faulty Towers: Tenure and the Structure of Higher Education", Ryan C. Amacher and Roger E. Meiners, The Independent Institute, 2004, 94 pp., ISBN 0945999895, and "A Baby Boomer's Guide to Their Second Sixties", Sunstone Press, February 1, 2012, Ryan Custer Amacher, ISBN 978-0865348554. Ryan Amacher retired from UT Arlington in 2012.

=== Death ===
Ryan C. Amacher died in Lake Shore, Minnesota where he lived, on November 25, 2016, at the age of 71.

== Awards and activities ==
Ryan Amacher's awards include selection as a Governor's Fellow, University of Virginia, 1969–1971, Distinguished Alumnus, Ripon College, 1987, The Order of the Palmetto (South Carolina), 1992, and Paul Harris Fellow, Awarded by Greater Southwest Rotary, Arlington, Texas, 1993.
