= Frank Harrison (academic) =

American university administrator (1913–2013)

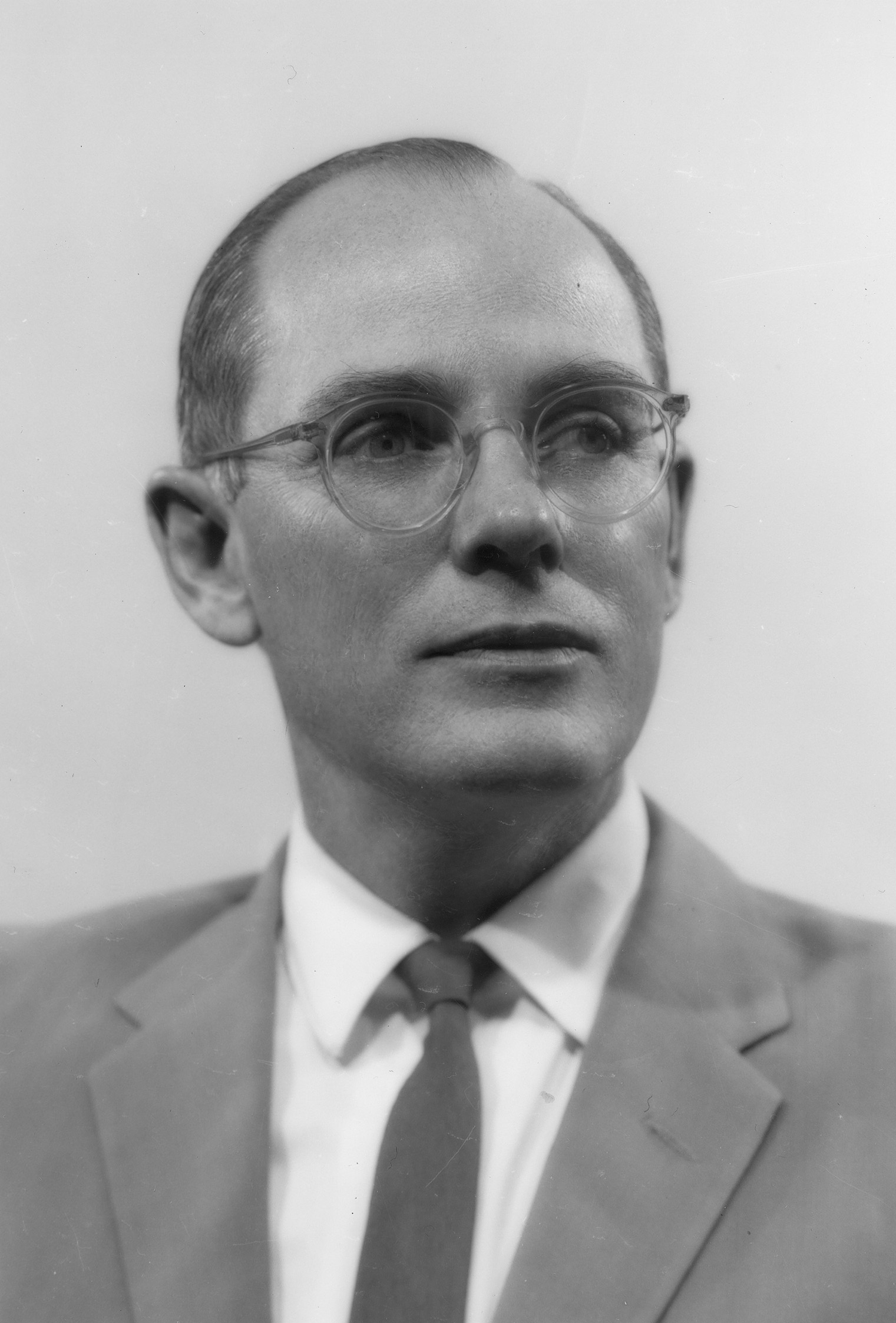

2nd President of the University of Texas at Arlington
- In office 1969–1972
- Preceded by: Jack Woolf
- Succeeded by: Wendell Nedderman

1st President of the University of Texas Health Science Center at San Antonio
- In office 1972–1985
- Preceded by: Office established
- Succeeded by: John P. Howe III

Personal details
- Born: Frank Harrison Jr. November 21, 1913 Dallas, Texas, U.S.
- Died: August 9, 2013 (aged 99) Dallas, Texas, U.S.
- Education: Southern Methodist University (BS); Northwestern University (MS); University of Texas Southwestern Medical Center (PhD)

Frank Harrison Jr. (November 21, 1913 – August 9, 2013) was an American physician, professor and university administrator.

Harrison was born in 1913 in Dallas, Texas, and educated at Southern Methodist University, Northwestern University and UT Southwestern Medical School. He received the B.Sc. Chemistry in 1957 from SMU, the M.Sc. (1936) and Ph.D. (1938) from Northwestern University and the M.D. from UT Southwestern Medical School in 1956. Harrison pursued a long career of service within The University of Texas System, notably at UT Southwestern, University of Texas at Arlington and University of Texas Health Science Center at San Antonio.

== Career ==
After receiving his Ph.D., Harrison taught at the University of Tennessee for 13 years before returning to Dallas to teach pathology and anatomy at UT Southwestern Medical Center. After serving as associate dean of the Dallas Medical School and its college of graduate studies, in 1965 he was asked to assume the additional responsibilities of starting graduate education at University of Texas at Arlington. In 1968, following the establishment of six graduate programs at UTA, he became acting president, and in 1969 he was named president of UTA. Harrison also served as an adjunct professor of electrical engineering at SMU From 1964 to 1970.

The UT Board of Regents selected Harrison in 1972 to be the first president of the newly created University of Texas Health Science Center at San Antonio, a post he held until his retirement in 1985. When it was established the Health Science Center employed 1,000 faculty and staff, conducted sponsored research on the order of $3 million, and enrolled 500 students. By September 1984 the faculty and staff size had risen to 3,000, pursuing funded research of $32 million. The enrollment had more than quadrupled to 2,300 students. The UTHSCSA physical facilities stood at 1.6 million square feet having begun operation in 1972 with 440,000 square feet. During this 13-year period from 1972 to 1985, the Dental School, School of Nursing and other buildings were also added.

== Honors, awards and memberships ==
In 1971, Harrison was named Distinguished Alumnus of Southern Methodist University and in 1990 the Frank Harrison Chair in Reproductive Endocrinology was created at University of Texas Health Science Center at San Antonio in his honor. In November 2000 he was named President Emeritus of UTHSCSA.

Harrison was a member of Phi Beta Kappa, Alpha Omega Alpha, Kappa Sigma, Alpha Kappa Kappa, American Association of Anatomists, American Physiological Society, Texas Philosophical Society, Biophys. Society, Institute of Electrical and Electronics Engineers (IEEE), and the Society Experimental Biology and Medicine.

Dr. Frank Harrison died in Dallas, Texas on August 9, 2013, at the age of 99.

== Additional sources ==
- https://www.utsouthwestern.edu/newsroom/center-times/year-2013/october/harrison-obit.html
- http://www.uta.edu/utamagazine/archive-issues/2010-13/in-memoriam/
- http://www.uta.edu/ucomm/internalcommunications/mavwire/2013/aug22.php
- http://www.uta.edu/publications/utamagazine/spring_2004/stories7235.html
- http://www.lib.utexas.edu/taro/utarl/00086/arl-00086.html
- http://www.lib.utexas.edu/taro/utarl/00174/arl-00174.html
- UT Arlington Media Guide 2008–2009
- http://www.uta.edu/engineering/timeline.php
