= History of the University of South Carolina =

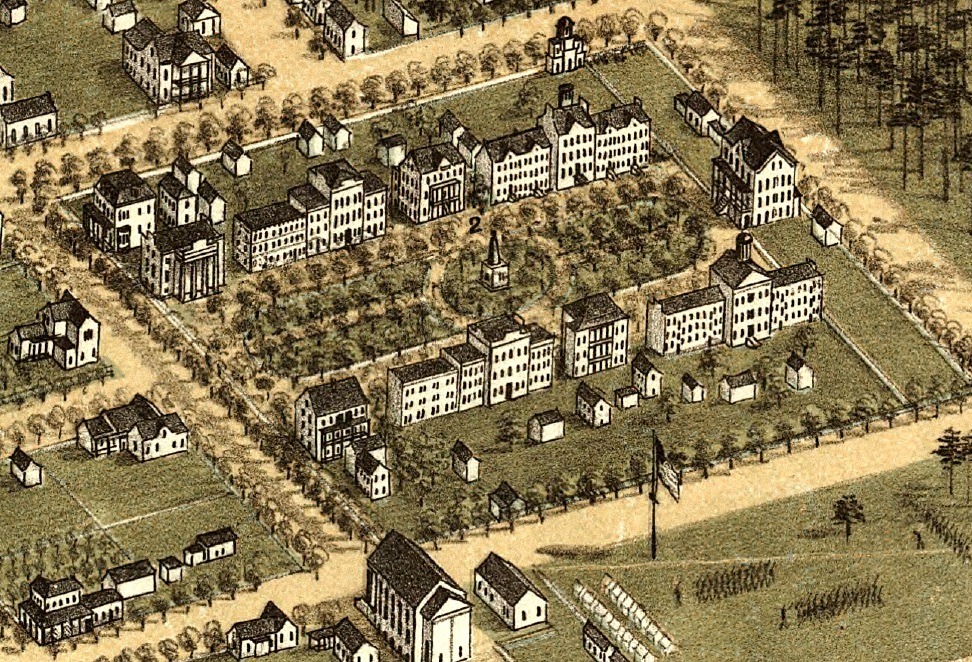
An 1872 illustration of the Horseshoe, USC's original campus. The Maxcy Monument is in the center

This history of the University of South Carolina began in the 18th century when intersectional differences arose between the Lowcountry and the Upstate. It was conceived that a state supported college located in the center of the state at Columbia, South Carolina, would foster friendships between those of both regions thus allowing the state to present a united front to the nation when threatened with issues jeopardizing the South Carolina way of life. The University of South Carolina's history can be described in four distinct phases: a firebrand college (1801–1862), constant reorganization (1865–1891), college to university (1891–1944) and the state's university (1944–present).

== Firebrand college, 1801–1862 ==
=== South Carolina College ===
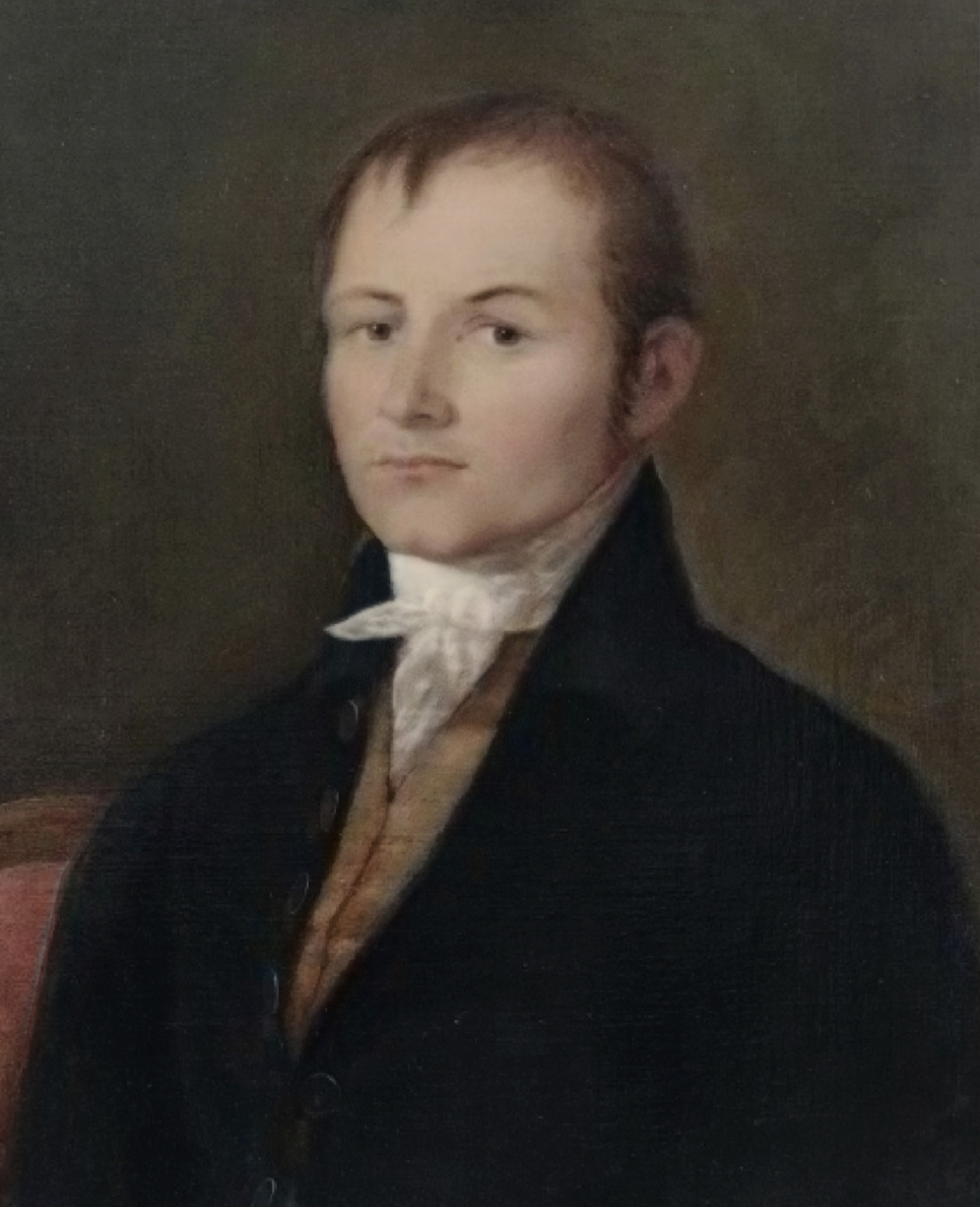
Jonathan Maxcy

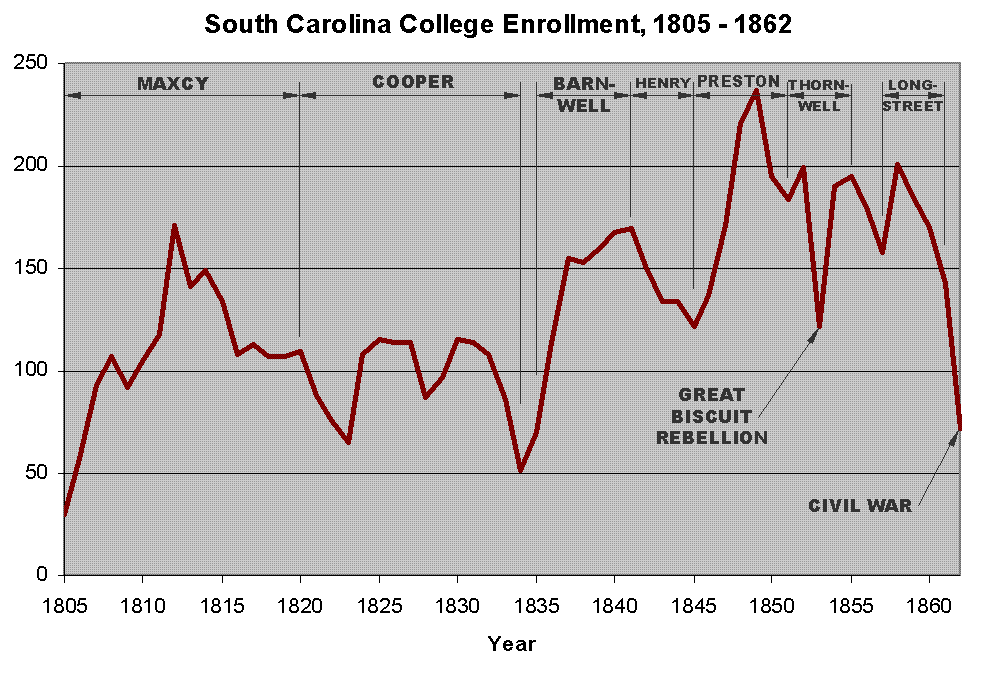
South Carolina College Enrollment

The university was founded as South Carolina College on December 19, 1801, by an act of the General Assembly after Governor John Drayton pushed for its foundation on November 23, 1801. The establishment of a publicly funded college at the capital was intended to unite and promote harmony between the Lowcountry and the Backcountry. On January 10, 1805, having an initial enrollment of nine students, the college commenced classes with a traditional classical curriculum. Jonathan Maxcy was its first president and served until his death in 1820.

With the generous support of the General Assembly, South Carolina College acquired a reputation as the leading institution of the South and attracted several noteworthy scholars, including Francis Lieber, Thomas Cooper, and Joseph LeConte. However, the college suffered greatly and lost most of its prestige when it closed during the American Civil War.

=== Civil War ===
The students formed a cadet company in December 1860 as national tensions rose following the election of Abraham Lincoln as President, but an order by Governor Pickens prevented them from leaving Columbia. Undeterred, the students disbanded their company on April 12 and formed a new company while en route to Charleston so that the governor's previous holding orders would be invalid. Once in Charleston, General Beauregard assigned the company to guard Sullivan's Island, much to the dismay of the students who greatly desired to be a part of the Battle of Fort Sumter. After three weeks of guard duty, the student cadet company returned to Columbia to a hero's welcome.

Later in June 1861, the students reformed the company and requested to be accepted for service. Governor Pickens accepted their request provided that the faculty also approved the venture, but the faculty did not give its consent because they did not want the college to needlessly be closed. The frustrated students even went as far as negotiating service of their unit with President Jefferson Davis, who agreed, but again Governor Pickens denied their use because the faculty was not willing to let them go.

When the students returned in October, they reorganized their military unit as the "third company." The Union attack of the South Carolina coast in November at the Battle of Port Royal led Governor Pickens to agree to their request to be mustered for active duty, but President Longstreet and the faculty steadfastly maintained their opposition to the students leaving for service. However, with the support of the governor the students ignored the protests of the faculty and departed for the Lowcountry. Governor Pickens kept the student company in Charleston to serve as his bodyguard and because the Union forces at Port Royal did not press their advantage, he released the students from military service on December 10.

Seventy-two students were present for classes in January 1862 and the college functioned as best it could until a call by the Confederate government for South Carolina to fill its quota of 18,000 soldiers. A system of conscription would begin on March 20 for all men between the ages of eighteen and forty-five, so on March 8 all of the students at the college volunteered for service in order to avoid the dishonor of having been conscripted. Despite the depletion of students, the professors issued a notice that the college would temporarily close and would reopen to those under eighteen. When the college reopened on March 17, only nine students showed up for classes and it became quite apparent to all that the college would not last past the end of the term in June.

On June 25 with the consent of the state government, the Confederate authorities took possession of the college buildings and converted them into a hospital. After many unsuccessful attempts to reopen the college, the trustees passed a resolution on December 2, 1863, that officially closed the college. By February 1865, Sherman's army had reached the outskirts of Columbia and the college was spared from destruction by the Union forces because of its use as a hospital. In addition, a company of the 25th Iowa Volunteer Infantry Regiment was stationed at the campus on February 17 to protect it from harm and to thwart pillaging by other Union soldiers.

== Reorganization, 1865–1891 ==
=== Radical University ===
The Union army took possession of the college on May 24, 1865, and although the future for the college under military control, General John Porter Hatch sent a letter on June 19 to the remaining professors at the college that it should reopen as soon as possible. The appointment of Benjamin Franklin Perry as provisional governor of South Carolina on June 30 by President Andrew Johnson restored civilian rule to the state. Perry reinstated the trustees to their positions and the board met on September 20 to authorize the college to reopen on the first Monday of January in 1866.

In a message to the legislature in October, Perry sought to convert the college into a university because with the state in an impoverished situation, it would provide a more practical education. The model that he wished to follow was the elective system used by the University of Virginia. Perry was succeeded in November as governor by James Lawrence Orr, a graduate of the University of Virginia, who also wished to see the college adopt the curriculum of his alma mater. Little opposition developed to change the college into a university and bill to establish the University of South Carolina was passed by the General Assembly on December 19, 1865, sixty-four years after the institution's foundation.

The schools of the university remained largely the same as they were in the college, with the addition of a school of engineering and mathematics. For the students, the difference was great because they were given much more freedom than afforded in the college, and they were given the ability to choose their classes rather than having to submit to a compulsory curriculum identical for all. Perry and Orr believed that the relaxed atmosphere at the university would allow it to prosper and reach three or four hundred students in a few years.

The reopening of the university was pushed back to January 10 due to the dilapidated condition of the buildings on the campus and to celebrate the anniversary of the original opening of South Carolina College. Fewer than fifty students attended in the first term, which alarmed Governor Orr. He recommended to the General Assembly that schools of law and medicine be added, which the legislature established in 1866. Despite this step, the university faced an ominous future as the state was beginning to undergo Reconstruction.

After Radical Republicans gained control of the state government in 1868, they sought to integrate the university; the constitution of 1868 had stated that all universities of the state should be "free and open to all the children and youths of the State, without regard to race and color." Former Governor Orr urged the legislature to preserve the university as an institution for the whites and to convert the dormant campus of The Citadel into a college for the blacks. Governor Robert Kingston Scott ignored this request and recommended that the legislature bring the university into compliance with the Morrill Act to make it qualify as a land grant college and accept federal aid; it had to remove race as an admissions criteria.

The University Act of 1869 reorganized the university and provided it with generous state financial support. An amendment was added to the act by W. J. Whipper, a black representative from Beaufort, to prevent racial discrimination from the admissions policy of the university. The legislature elected two black trustees to the governing board of the university on March 9, 1869. Franklin J. Moses, Jr., state representative and speaker of the house, also supported admission of all races to the state school. In October 1873, Henry E. Hayne, the Republican secretary of state, was admitted as the first black student; he was of mostly white ancestry with a white politician father.

The admission of black students to the university was inevitable, and three factors contributed to this. First, the university never achieved a level of enrollment that was commensurate with its financial backing by the legislature. Enrollment never exceeded one hundred students, whereas the enrollment at Wofford College exceeded that mark in 1870. White students were believed to avoid the university from fear it would be integrated. The second reason was the failure of the state to provide an adequate public university for the education of blacks. It was trying to compensate rapidly for the state's failure to educate blacks in the antebellum years. In 1872, funds were allocated for the Agricultural and Mechanical Institute at Orangeburg, but they were badly mismanaged. Black legislators called for the opening of the university to black students. Finally, the state Republican party split for the election of 1872 between Radical and moderate factions. The Radicals won and pressed their advantage by electing four blacks to the Board of Trustees, thus constituting a majority.

The legislature established a normal school to train teachers for the lower grades on the campus of the university as well as a preparatory school, since most black students of the state had been deprived of strong academic training in years past. In addition, to encourage enrollment by blacks, tuition and other fees were abolished. On October 7, 1873, Henry E. Hayne, the Secretary of State of South Carolina, became the first black student when he registered for the fall session in the medical college of the university. As a result of his enrollment, three professors resigned, and some white students left.

On October 8, enrollment stood at eight students, seven of whom were the sons of professors. The number increased to twenty-two students after many politicians registered with the university to show that it was open for both races, yet few of the politicians attended classes. Troubled by the low enrollment, State Treasurer of South Carolina, Francis L. Cardozo went to Washington and persuaded a handful of students at Howard University to transfer to the university. Drastic measures were required to increase the number of students and the legislature passed an act in February 1874 to provide for 124 scholarships of $200. The conservative press denounced this move because with the absence of tuition, it meant that students were effectively being paid to attend the university, but poor students were often critical to family support, and scholarships helped them cover living expenses. Many of the scholarship students could not meet the entrance requirements into the freshman class, so the faculty assembled them into a sub-freshman class. This plan was abolished in 1875 as the legislature had not authorized it.

The scholarships achieved their desired effect in increasing enrollment and by 1875, 90% of the student body was black. The University of South Carolina holds the distinction of being the only state university in the South to admit and grant degrees to black students during Reconstruction. Opponents of desegregation blamed the changes on it being occupied by outsiders and labeled it as "the radical university." Richard T. Greener, one of the black students to graduate during this period, soon rejoined the university as its first black professor and librarian. T. McCants Stewart, William D. Crum, William Sinclair, and Alonzo Townsend were other black students during this era of Reconstruction.

When the Democrats regained control of the state legislature in 1876, they quickly acted to end admission of blacks, closing the university on June 7, 1877, by a joint resolution of the General Assembly. They passed legislation authorizing only white students and setting up Claflin College as the state institution for black students. Professor Greener, the university's first black professor, had to leave to Washington D.C.

=== Redeemer University ===
It was far from certain that the university would be reopened and debate ensued in the General Assembly over the necessity of the university. Many legislators, led by Martin Witherspoon Gary, felt that the state had other obligations and it was not practical for the state to spend money on the university. In addition, these legislators were from the Upstate and had no attachment to the university. They were not part of the planter elite and had attended other schools. An act to reorganize the university was passed by the state Senate by two votes on March 2, 1878, but it did not provide for the appropriation of funds to the reopening. The act specified that the university was to consist of two branches, one styled as the South Carolina College in Columbia for the whites and Claflin College in Orangeburg for the blacks. In order to mollify agitation by the farming interests, a section of the act specified that an agricultural department was to be established with the university.

On October 5, 1880, the institution was reopened as the South Carolina College of Agriculture and Mechanic Arts and largely derived its funding from the Morrill Act. Despite its name as an agriculture and mechanical college, few students showed an interest in either area. Only nine students worked the 20-acre (81,000 m^{2}) college farm for the first session and just twenty-one attended the mechanical shop. Because the state could not afford a liberal arts university, it took advantage of the Morrill Act in order to acquire federal funds, and offered some agriculture program to satisfy its requirements.

By 1881, the state's financial situation was markedly improved and Governor Johnson Hagood called for greater expenditures on higher education. With a much higher appropriation, the trustees abolished the farming and mechanical foreman positions, in 1882 restoring the institution to its antebellum status as the South Carolina College. An agriculture department remained, but little of the curriculum was agricultural, and it was essentially identical to the general science program. The department suffered from neglect because its professor, John McLaren McBryde, was also the president of the institution and in that position he focused most of his energies.

In the latter years of the 1880s, the college increasingly came under attack from religious groups and agricultural interests. The denominational colleges, struggling to rebuild from the Civil War, demanded that free tuition be ended at the college, and the General Assembly capitulated in 1887 by fixing tuition rates at $40 per year. Led by Ben Tillman [who owned 400 acres as a planter, cultivated by tenant farmers], the agrarians pushed to establish a separate agriculture college because they believed that the college was not providing an adequate education in agriculture. Despite Tillman's rhetoric, a majority of the students were sons of farmers. At that time, the most advanced agricultural research was being conducted at Cornell and the University of California, both liberal arts colleges.

To take advantage of the Hatch Act and to assuage the concerns of the farmers, the legislature passed an act in 1887 to reorganize the college as the University of South Carolina with six schools and colleges. An agricultural experiment station was set up, the college farm was expanded by 100 acres (0.40 km^{2}), and a well-developed agriculture program was initiated. The university was so successful that Ben Tillman announced his retirement from public life.

Thomas Green Clemson bequeathed his estate in 1888 to establish and endow a separate agriculture college in the state. Tillman reemerged to carry the cause to the legislature and in 1889, Governor Richardson signed the bill accepting the bequest. The Morrill and Hatch funds were transferred to the new agriculture college in June 1890, and the university's agricultural department was closed. The vitality of the university was threatened during the 1890 campaign when Ben Tillman advocated its closing. Although he won the election for governor, he completed reorganization of the university as a liberal arts college during his term.

== College to university, 1891–1944 ==
=== Wounded institution ===
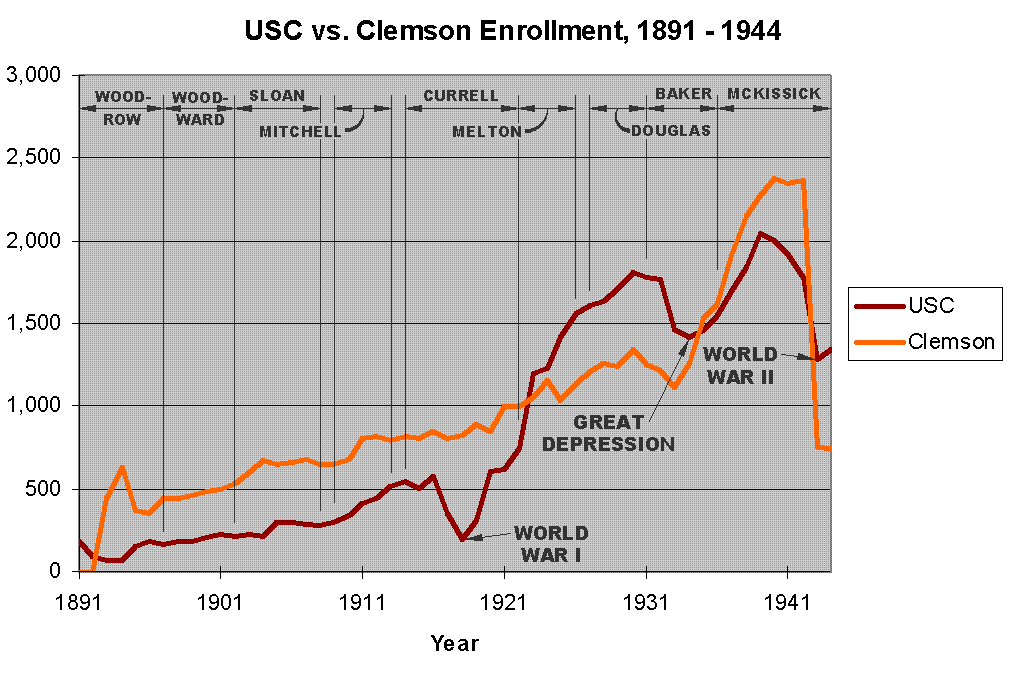
USC Enrollment

The university was reorganized as the South Carolina College in 1891, and it struggled to attract students through the rest of the decade. It was restricted to teaching the subjects of law, literature, classics, and theoretical science. The prestige of the college had fallen such that in 1893, a proposal was offered in the legislature to close the campus and provide homes for Confederate veterans on it instead. With enrollment lagging and the state lacking a liberal arts school for women, the legislature passed a bill in 1893 that mandated the college to admit women. On September 24, 1895, Frances Guignard Gibbes was the first woman to be admitted to the college, and in 1898 Mattie Jean Adams was the first to graduate.

Although Tillman had crippled the institution when he became governor, he did not let it die. The number of students steadily declined from a high of 235 in 1889 to a low of 68 in 1894; but despite the urging of legislators to close it, Tillman ensured through his governorship that the college received an adequate level of funding. Tillman re-established the normal school at the college, long dormant since the end of Reconstruction. In addition, the legislature authorized adding engineering to the college in 1894 despite a previous prohibition.

=== Reemergence as a university ===
The victory by Duncan Clinch Heyward in the gubernatorial election of 1902 marked the end of Tillmanism and the return of support by the governor's office for the institution. Heyward pushed the legislature to convert the college into a university in 1905 to mark the centennial by providing the state with a capstone for its educational system. The effort failed when legislators feared that The Citadel was to be absorbed into the university, but the measure was reintroduced in 1906 and passed on February 17 to charter the institution for the last time as the University of South Carolina.

For the next forty years, the institution struggled to find its identity as it cycled through periods of achieving popularity versus academic excellence. Under the vigorous leadership of President Samuel Chiles Mitchell from 1909 to 1913, enrollment at the university doubled; he brought the university to the state by setting up extension courses in 1910. Incessant criticism by Governor Coleman Livingston Blease over Mitchell's handling of university affairs led to his resignation and the trustees elected William Spenser Currell with the intention of raising the level of scholarship at the university. Entrance requirements were made more stringent and Currell's efforts were rewarded when in 1917 the university became the first state-supported college or university in South Carolina to earn accreditation by the Southern Association.

The entrance of America into World War I was enthusiastically supported by the student body, and the vast majority participated in the ROTC unit at the university. To compensate for the loss of enrollment because of conscription, the war department replaced the ROTC program with the Student Army Training Corps. After the war, the SATC was disbanded and military training was made compulsory for freshman and sophomore students in the ROTC program. The ROTC program was scrapped in 1921 due to lack of interest.

Women's enrollment at the university had been rising since they were first admitted in 1895, and during the 1920s, women comprised a quarter of the student population. During World War I, women were finally allowed to live on campus, in dormitories that had been occupied by male students. In 1924, the university built the first women's dormitory, which was later called Wade Hampton College.

An aura of stagnation existed at the university in the early 1920s and the trustees elected William Davis Melton in 1922 to revive its fortunes. Melton launched a campaign to popularize the institution by convincing the people of the state that it was not exclusively for the elite or a special interest group, but rather for the masses. He gained a major increase in the appropriation by the legislature for the university, and in 1924 student enrollment surpassed that of Clemson for the first time. Following Melton's death in 1926, Davison McDowell Douglas was elected president to consolidate the gains and tighten academic standards. The board of trustees called upon James Rion McKissick in 1936 to return to Melton's policies of popularizing the university.

In 1937, Charles Bruce Bailey attempted to desegregate the university by applying as a black applicant to its law school. He was the grandson of Paris Simkins, who had graduated from USC's law school in 1876 when it was briefly desegregated. Bailey's application was rejected.

McKissick established the University News Service to combat perceived misconceptions of the university and to promote the high moral character of the students. Due in large part to his efforts, enrollment reached record numbers and the university entered the 1940s with a renewed sense of optimism. Yet, the world soon became engulfed by World War II. To help with the loss of enrollment because of mobilization, the university received a Naval ROTC detachment. The university was quickly transformed into a Naval school when the Navy set up a V-5 Navy Flight Preparatory School, a Civil Aeronautics Administration-War Training Service program, and a V-12 Navy College Training Program. The V-12 program was the most important to the university because the trainees were enrolled in classes; they became active participants in student life and extracurricular activities.

== The State's University, 1944–present ==
=== New and greater university ===
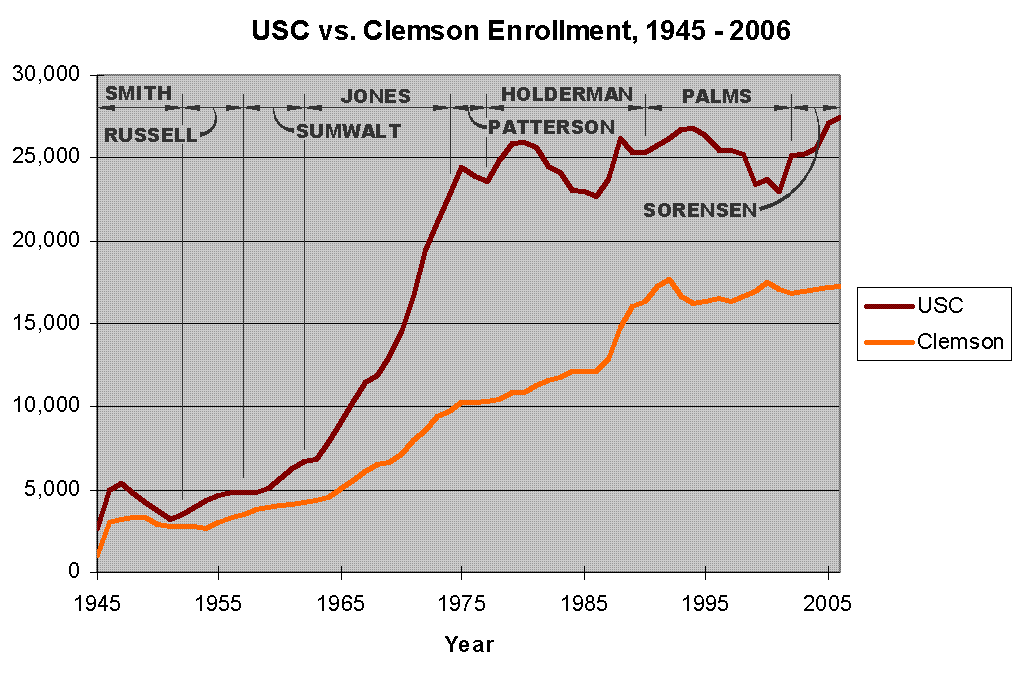
USC enrollment

By November 1944 it was clear that World War II would soon be coming to a close and the servicemen would return to enroll in the university in massive numbers due in large part because of the passage of the G.I. Bill. Speaker of the South Carolina House of Representatives and trustee of the university Solomon Blatt unveiled a proposal called the "new and greater university" plan that would move the university from its present site to a 1,200-acre (4.9 km^{2}) site just outside Columbia. At the time, the university was the smallest state university in the South and a larger campus would more easily allow for expansion at much less cost. The idea of a move came from that of the relocation of Louisiana State University in 1925 and it was envisioned that a new campus would provide the impetus for the University of South Carolina "to establish itself as a great American state university."

Blatt obtained support from all the key players in the politics of South Carolina to facilitate the proposal: Governor Olin D. Johnston, Governor-elect Ransome Judson Williams, Chairman of the Senate Budget Committee Edgar Allan Brown, and Chairman of the House Ways and Means Committee Morris Tuten. The Board of Trustees approved the plan in December 1944 by a vote of 17–2, although complaints were issued from the dissenting voters that the decision was made with too much haste and without any input from the public. In addition, Blatt chose Navy Rear Admiral Norman Murray Smith as the president of the university in large part because he held connections in the political establishments of South Carolina and the federal government necessary to secure funds for the relocation of the university.

However, Blatt's proposal caused an intense uproar in the state because alumni and students felt that it would needlessly sever the university from its antebellum tradition. Other complaints arose that the process itself did not allow for public input and it was detested as a product of the Barnwell Ring. Even with the outpouring of condemnation, municipalities lobbied to have the university moved to their locale such as Camden, Cheraw, Georgetown, Manning, Spartanburg, Sumter, Kershaw County and Oconee County. Blatt realized that his proposal in February 1945 would not receive the necessary support in the legislature and he modified it so that the university would expand upon its existing area. This idea was warmly received by the alumni and students, but it died in the Finance Committee after Senator Edgar Brown declined to take up the matter.

In 1946, John H. Wrighten III attempted to desegregate the university. He was a black senior attending South Carolina State College, and he applied to USC's law school, but his application was rejected on the basis of race.

After World War II, enrollment at the university swelled from the influx of veterans. They were wholeheartedly welcomed by President Smith who actively campaigned for their attendance and he announced that every qualified veteran would be admitted to the university. The vast majority of South Carolina veterans chose to attend the university because of its hospitable atmosphere, but also for other reasons. They did not want to attend Clemson or The Citadel because "the prospect of returning home to attend a military college was distasteful for the older men leaving the military after fighting the largest war in world history." In addition, Clemson's rural location and its self-imposed restriction on the number of students made it inaccessible for a large number of veterans. The university offered several special programs to meet the needs of the veterans and it continued an accelerated calendar until 1949. It was at this point in history that the two universities switched reputations and missions. Carolina became known as the university for the common man and an institution accessible for all whereas Clemson settled into a status of elitism.

President Smith faced increasing criticism through his tenure because he failed to articulate a clear policy for the university's future and he did not campaign for the legislature to appropriate enough funds for its needs. As president of a public university, Smith's chief responsibility was to be its publicist and develop ties with the political power of the state. Instead, Sol Blatt grew tired of having to carry the burden for the university in the legislature and Governor Thurmond felt that he received an icy reception from the administration. In 1952, Smith resigned and the protégé of Governor Byrnes, Donald S. Russell, was elected president by the Board of Trustees.

=== Growth and prosperity ===
The ascendancy of Russell was crucial for the university at a critical moment in its history because he brought youth and dynamic leadership to the Presidency. His vision for the university was for it to be the capstone of the state's higher education system and for it to be the senior partner to the other state colleges. Russell's first step toward building a great university was the strengthening of the faculty by bringing in nationally known professors. Secondly, he improved the academics at the university through the expansion of courses, the revamping of programs and the introduction of entrance examinations. A report conducted by MIT to overhaul the engineering department became the standard used by the American Society for Engineering Education to accredit all engineering schools. In response to the ruling by the Supreme Court of Brown v. Board of Education, the university instituted entrance examinations so as to prevent the mass rush of black high school graduates to enroll at USC. The examinations were also welcomed because they would promote individual merit over wealth or connections and USC became the first college to introduce entrance examinations. Thirdly, a massive building and renovation program was initiated and it was made possible through the acquisition of the properties on the southern boundary of the campus. The renaissance enjoyed by the university became evident by the speakers for commencement addresses and special convocations. Among the distinguished who came to speak at the university were John F. Kennedy, Carl Sandburg, Arthur M. Schlesinger, Jr., René Pleven, and John Foster Dulles.

Russell resigned in 1957 so that he could run for governor in 1958 and Robert L. Sumwalt was named as the temporary president by the trustees. By the end of the summer of 1958, Russell had failed to win the Democratic nomination for governor and the university was still without a permanent president. A movement was started to bring Russell back as the President and he gave positive indications that he would return as president if offered. Yet, many were opposed because they felt that Russell was opportunistic and would leave the university again for the next gubernatorial campaign. Russell had also annoyed many associated with the university through his harsh rhetoric against Ernest Hollings on the campaign trail. The board of trustees was split and instead voted unanimously in 1959 to make Sumwalt the permanent president.

An initiative started by Russell and continued by Sumwalt was the establishment of regional campuses and the formation of the University System. The first extension campus was set up at Florence in 1957 and additional campuses were gained in Beaufort, Lancaster and Conway in 1959. Another campus was added to the system in 1961 at Aiken. The University System served two purposes, it expanded the university's reach across the state and the branch campuses acted as a feeder system for the main campus in Columbia.

During this period, more black students tried to desegregate the university, like Charles Bruce Bailey and John H. Wrighten III before them. In 1958, 11 black seniors from Allen University applied to USC but were denied admission. In 1960, Lloyd Weston and Raymond Weston, who attended South Carolina State College, applied to USC. Their applications were also rejected.

=== Desegregation ===
Henrie Dobbins Monteith began the final desegregation of the university when she applied for admission as an undergraduate in 1962. She said that she felt compelled to fight personally for desegregation because she grew up in a family of civil rights activists, and her aunt was Modjeska Monteith Simkins. The university denied Monteith's application, and she began a lawsuit against the university along with her lawyer, Matthew J. Perry. While her lawsuit proceeded through appeals, two other black applicants joined her lawsuit: Robert G. Anderson, Jr., and James L. Solomon. The university's president, Robert L. Sumwalt, retired in 1962 and he was replaced by Thomas F. Jones, who governed the university's resistance to integration efforts. Clemson admitted Harvey Gantt in January 1963 and by now it seemed inevitable that USC would be forced to admit black students. By then, the University of South Carolina was the last flagship university to desegregate.

Racial tensions were high that year and the local newspapers frequently covered the possibility of integrating the university. Many white community members were opposed and resentful of the likely change, but community leaders on both sides wanted to avoid violent backlash like what had happened in Alabama and Mississippi. Monteith's uncle's home was bombed after her repeated applications, but violence was limited to harassment on campus. Elizabeth C. LeDeen, part of the Council on Human Relations, set up meetings with Monteith, Anderson, Solomon, as well as the students desegregating Clemson: Harvey Gantt and Lucinda Brawley. They acted out scenarios to practice how they would respond to harassment, and Solomon later said he was already used to this treatment because he had helped to desegregate the Air Force.

On September 11, 1963, Henrie Dobbins Monteith, Robert G. Anderson, and James L. Solomon, Jr. were admitted to the university as the first black students since Reconstruction. Students who integrated the university feared violence and were excluded from many aspects of social life and extra-curriculars. USC requested federal troops to reduce the possibility of violence, like those used at the University of Alabama and the University of Mississippi the previous year. These precedents had a quelling effect on many segregationists in South Carolina, as represented by one student leader's thoughts: "we do not want integration . . . neither do we want to be blamed for the loss of dignity and integrity." Monteith and Anderson lived on campus and endured harassment in their dormitories and public spaces. Monteith received harassing phone calls and deliveries to her room, while Anderson was frequently insulted and called racial slurs. In his first year he was woken up in the middle of the night by students kicking his door, threatening him, and bouncing basketballs outside. According to Solomon, Anderson bought a pistol to protect himself if anyone entered his dorm. Monteith felt supported in the cafeteria because, even as she ate alone, she had support and friendship from the mostly black staff who cooked and cleaned there. Solomon was in a new PhD program for mathematics at USC, and rememberd that students would insult and harass him around campus, but would act politely when talking face to face. He recalled that one professor, a Nazi scientist from Germany who had come to the U.S. to work for the military, harassed him in class but treated two Jewish students much worse, and they left the program after one year.

Also in 1963, James Hollins applied for classes at USC's Beaufort campus, and his registration was delayed to follow the nationally followed registration of Monteith, Anderson, and Solomon. Hollins served in the Marine Corps at the time, and he began his classes with six other soldiers, all white, escorting him between classes to serve as support. Hollins later said he felt welcomed by the faculty and students on the Beaufort campus, and that "even after fighting for my country in two wars, the fight for my education was the fight of my life."

Monteith became the first black graduate of the 20th century when she earned her B.S. in 1965. She also became the university's first black woman graduate.

=== Expansion ===
For the next two decades following integration, the university experienced rapid growth and expansion due in large part to the baby boomer generation entering college. Enrollment stood at 5,660 in 1960, but by 1979 had reached nearly 26,000 students on the Columbia campus alone. The expansion of the university was not limited to the Columbia campus; additional campuses and colleges were set up throughout the state. Clemson established an extension center in 1965 at Sumter, only 40 miles (64 km) away from Columbia. Sol Blatt, then the Speaker of the House, wrote President Tom Jones that "the University should build as many two year colleges over the State as rapidly as possible to prevent the expansion of Clemson schools for the Clemson people." President Jones heeded Blatt's advice and over the next decade, the university added campuses in Allendale, Spartanburg, Union and Walterboro. The Clemson extension at Sumter never proved popular, and USC acquired the campus in 1973.

The growth of the university in the 1960s and 70s also brought with it the social activism and disorder of the time. Due to the massive influx of so many students in a short time period, the administration lost control of student life. Drug and alcohol use became so rampant at the university that it became known as a party school. Black students protested the assassination of Martin Luther King Jr. in April 1968 by setting fire to Hamilton College and the USC Field House. On May 7, 1970, approximately 400 students seized the Russell House as a symbolic gesture towards honoring those killed in the Kent State shootings and four days later on May 11, they attempted to meet with the members of the board of trustees, but were rebuffed. Columbia police were called in to quell the student protest but were ineffective. State troopers were also unable to disperse the students. National Guard troops were ordered to the campus by Gov. Bob McNair, and soon dispersed most of the protestors with tear gas. The inability of the administration to control such student outbursts led to President Jones' resignation in 1974. But he had succeeded in turning a sleepy southern college into a full-fledged research institution.

=== International recognition ===
James B. Holderman, a flamboyant and charming executive, was elected president by the board of trustees in 1977. Right away, Holderman championed a proposal to create an honors college because it would foster an academic environment conducive to excellence necessary to keep South Carolina's best students instate. The proposal was approved and the first students were admitted into the South Carolina Honors College in 1978.

A persistent problem for the university was the Columbia campus's relationship with the semi-autonomous regional campuses. Once a campus reached a Full-time equivalent of 1,000 students, it was entitled to become a four-year college and the campuses in Aiken, Spartanburg, and Conway took advantage of this rule. The law providing such a transformation was repealed, but it was apparent that the regional campuses were acting in their own interests and not for the university system. Furthermore, the Columbia campus had to compete against its regional campuses for funding because each campus submitted its budget to the General Assembly. To correct these problems, Holderman issued the Carolina Plan that outlined a centralized and unified approach to be taken by the university system. This meant that it would be necessary for lawmakers to fully fund the university system in order for the branch campus to receive the funds they need. The Carolina Plan worked brilliantly as the university system was fully funded in 1977 for the first time since 1967.

Following up on his success with the Carolina Plan, Holderman issued the Carolina Plan II which called for making USC an international university and a "Window to the World." To achieve his goals, Holderman used his connections and his personal charisma to attract world leaders to the USC campus. He was able to put USC on the map by bringing in such world leaders as UN Secretary-General Kurt Waldheim, President Ronald Reagan, Prime Minister Malcolm Fraser and many other foreign dignitaries. The highlight of the visits was that of Pope John Paul II in 1987. He exclaimed on the Horseshoe that "it is wonderful to be young and a student at the University of South Carolina." The Pope later led a non-denominational service before more than 60,000 at Williams-Brice Stadium.

The international spotlight on the university came at a price and an inquisitive journalism student led to Holderman's downfall. Paul Perkins, a journalism student upset with tuition increases, requested that the university release the salary of visiting professor Jehan Sadat. Holderman balked and refused to release the details even after Perkins and his wife Cheryl filed a Freedom of Information Act request. This denial and the secrecy on the part of the administration led the media to scrutinize other aspects of Holderman's presidency. They inspected his travel budgets and construction contracts and found overwhelming evidence of financial irregularities and extravagant spending. In face of all the negative publicity, Holderman resigned in 1990. Holderman would later be convicted of laundering drug money in 2003. The university trustees elected John M. Palms to succeed Holderman to restore the institution's credibility and respect in the state and world. After leading the university's bicentennial celebrations in 2001, Palms retired and was replaced by Andrew A. Sorensen in 2002. During his tenure from 2002 to 2008, Sorensen raised large sums for research, including a $300 million grant for colorectal cancer. In the spirit of Palms' "Cathedrals of Excellence" budgeting philosophy, the board of directors moved to transform university land on Assembly Street into an "innovation district" called Innovista that will develop four strengths: biomedicine, nanotechnology, environmental science and alternative fuels. The Board of Trustees announced the selection of Harris Pastides as the university's 28th president on July 11, 2008. After 11 years as president, Pastides was succeeded by former Superintendent of West Point Robert L. Caslen on August 1, 2019.

== Previous Institution Names ==
Chartered as South Carolina College on December 19, 1801

Chartered as the University of South Carolina on January 10, 1866

Chartered as South Carolina College of Agriculture and Mechanics on October 3, 1880

Chartered as South Carolina College in 1882

Chartered as the University of South Carolina on May 9, 1888

Chartered as South Carolina College on April 21, 1890

Chartered as the University of South Carolina on February 17, 1906

== Literary societies ==
Student literary societies were an important part of student life at Carolina for the first 150 years or so. The Philomathic was the first such society and was formed within weeks of the opening of SCC in 1805; it included practically the whole student body. In 1806 it was split into the Clariosophic and Euphradian societies. After the university admitted women students, the Hypatian Society was founded in 1915 for women, followed by the Euphrosynean Society in 1924. While both the Clariosophic and Euphradian Societies were deactivated in the 1970s, alumni from the Euphradian Society reactivated the organization in 2010. The Clariosophic Society was reactivated in 2013. Both societies continue to operate to this day.

== Resources ==
- Faulkenbury, Evan (2025). History of the University of South Carolina (USC) - Annotated primary and secondary source bibliography and library guide on USC's history.
- Green, Edwin L. (1916). A History of the University of South Carolina. The State Company.
- Hollis, Daniel Walker (1951). University of South Carolina. South Carolina College. Vol. I. University of South Carolina Press.
- Hollis, Daniel Walker (1956). University of South Carolina. College to University. Vol. II. University of South Carolina Press.
- Horn, Chris and Evan Faulkenbury (2020- ) Remembering the Days - USC's podcast about its history
- LaBorde, M.D., M. (1859). History of the South Carolina College. Peter B. Glass.
- Lesesne, Henry H. (2001). A History of the University of South Carolina, 1940–2000. University of South Carolina Press.
