= List of presidents of the University of South Carolina =

The following is a list of the presidents of the University of South Carolina from its founding as South Carolina College in 1801, to the present day.

== Presidents of the University of South Carolina ==
No.	Image	Name	Term start	Term end	Ref.
South Carolina College (1801–1865)
1		Jonathan Maxcy	1804	1820	
2		Thomas Cooper	1821	1834	
acting (Note: Serving as President pro tempore)		Robert Henry	1834	1834	
acting (Note: Serving as Chairman of the Faculty)		Henry Junius Nott	1834	1835	
3		Robert Woodward Barnwell	1835	1841	
4		Robert Henry	1841	1845	
5		William C. Preston	1845	1851	
acting		Francis Lieber	1851	1851	
6		James H. Thornwell	1851	1855	
7		Charles F. McCay	1855	1857	
8		Augustus B. Longstreet	1857	1861	
acting		Maximilian LaBorde	1861	1865	
University of South Carolina (1866–1877)
acting		Robert Woodward Barnwell	1865	1873 (Note: Removed by Republicans Board of Trustees members who saw him "as an obstacle to the integration of South Carolina College")	
acting		Benjamin B. Babbitt	1873	1875	
acting		Anson W. Cummings	1875	1877	
South Carolina College of Agriculture and Mechanics (1880–1881)
9		William Porcher Miles	1880	1882	
South Carolina College (1882–1905)
10		John McLaren McBryde	1883	1891	
11		James Woodrow	1891	1897	
12		Frank C. Woodward	1897	1902	
acting (Note: Serving as Acting President)		Benjamin Sloan	1902	1903	
13		Benjamin Sloan	1903	1908	
University of South Carolina (1905–present)
acting		Andrew C. Moore	1908	1909	
14		Samuel Chiles Mitchell	1909	1913	
acting		Andrew C. Moore	1913	1914	
15		William Spenser Currell	1914	1922	
16		William Davis Melton	1922	1926	
acting		Leonard T. Baker	1926	1926	
17		Davison McDowell Douglas	1927	1931	
18		Leonard T. Baker	1931	1936	
19		James Rion McKissick	1936	1944	
acting		Leonard T. Baker	1944	1945	
20		Norman Murray Smith	1945	1952	
acting		Francis Wright Bradley	1952	1952	
21		Donald S. Russell	1952	1957	
acting		Robert Llewellyn Sumwalt	1957	1959	
22		Robert Llewellyn Sumwalt	1959	1962	
23		Thomas F. Jones	1962	1974	
24		William H. Patterson	1974	1977	
25		James B. Holderman	1977	1990	
interim (Note: Serving as Interim President)		Arthur K. Smith	1990	1991	
26		John M. Palms	1991	June 30, 2002	
27		Andrew A. Sorensen	July 1, 2002	July 31, 2008	
28		Harris Pastides	August 1, 2008	July 31, 2019	
29		Robert L. Caslen	August 1, 2019	May 13, 2021 (Note: Resigned as a result of two controversies.)	
interim		Harris Pastides	May 13, 2021	June 30, 2022	
30		Michael Amiridis	July 1, 2022	present	

Table notes:
