= Innovista =

Innovista is the economic development arm of the University of South Carolina.

== The innovation district ==
The Innovation District is the physical campus of Innovista: 500 acres in the heart of downtown Columbia. The infrastructure is supported by the City of Columbia. A research park akin to ones developed around the country, which have, at their economic core, a research university: Research Triangle Park (Duke, UNC and NC State, North Carolina) and Silicon Valley (Stanford), the Innovation District will draw on the intellectual power of the university.

== Urban renewal ==
Innovista is also an urban plan to transform the area bordered by the Congaree River and Assembly, Blossom and Gervais Streets into a "vibrant place" to Live, Learn, Earn and Play in the heart of the city. The Innovista plan includes The Innovation District, where technical and creative talent can live and work, and the planned Waterfront District, a 100-acre Riverfront Park along the Congaree River with an outdoor amphitheater, bicycle and pedestrian paths.

== History ==
In 2005, the concept of Innovista was created by then-USC President Dr. Andrew Sorenson; Dr. Harris Pastides, then-USC Vice President for Research and Health Sciences and current USC President; and then-Columbia Mayor Bob Coble. At the time, USC research funding was growing significantly and the Carnegie Foundation had designated the university as an institution of "very high research activity," its highest distinction given only to 62 public research institutions. USC's signature research areas include hydrogen fuel cells and other alternative energies, health sciences, nanotechnology and material sciences; environmental sciences, and software and technology.

Innovista's initial plans called for construction of four buildings. Horizon I and Discovery I: designed for academic research; and companion buildings Horizon II and Discovery II: designed for private development and commercial firms. The public buildings were partially constructed and first occupied in 2009, however, funding to complete these buildings was not available until late 2011. Horizon I and Discovery I are currently home to several internationally renowned researchers.

The construction of the private buildings experienced obstacles including the failure of two private developers to obtain sufficient financing and the 2009 controversial firing of the second developer. In 2011, several existing private buildings were designated as preferred locations for Innovista affiliated firms including the Tower at 1301 Gervais Street also known as IT-oLogy @ Innovista; the USC-Columbia Technology Incubator; the SCRA USC Innovation Center; Midlands Technical College Business Accelerator; and IdeaLabs.

== Legislative support ==
The South Carolina General Assembly passed a series of legislative acts designed to help South Carolina research institutions develop world-class research for commercialization. The Centers of Economic Excellence Act helped USC attract an array of internationally recognized scientists through the associated public/private multimillion-dollar Centers of Economic Excellence Program. The Research University Infrastructure Act provided $58 million originally and another $14 million in additional funding to help finance the construction of the Horizon I and Discovery I buildings, and the Partners Act of 2006 assists high-tech firms and university startups find grant and seed funding.

== Select accomplishments ==
The University of South Carolina's Arnold School of Public Health is a leader in biomedical research, health disparities, bioterrorism preparedness, and disease prevention. In 2006, the Arnold School opened its new $26 million LEED-certified research facility on Assembly Street with additional space in the Discovery I building on Greene Street.

USC's Darla Moore School of Business, whose undergraduate international business program ranks number 1 in the nation, was relocating to the Innovation District, at Assembly and Greene Streets, to a new $90 million structure scheduled for completion by December 2013.

University of South Carolina professor Ken Reifsnider, a member of the National Academy of Engineers and the Scientific Advisory Board for the U.S. Air Force, creates high-performing, lower-cost composite alternatives for aerospace applications. His work has helped spawn a new Lightning Response Laboratory at the SCRA USC Innovation Center, which will refine the understanding of how modern aircraft and other structures are affected by electrical storms. This advanced material research will have implications for commercial airline manufacturers such as Boeing, which recently opened a manufacturing facility in North Charleston, South Carolina.

With the help of Innovista and leaders from the university and the S.C. Department of Commerce, USC alums Bill and Lou Kennedy are expanding their Florida-based company, Nephron Pharmaceuticals, to the Midlands with a $313 million manufacturing plant in Lexington, South Carolina scheduled for completion in 2014.

The USC Columbia Technology Incubator is home to many university startup companies. To date, the Incubator has graduated 31 companies from its program and created 754 jobs with an average salary of more than $63,000.
