= Japanese Monographs =

The Japanese Monographs, Japanese Studies on Manchuria, and Japanese Night Combat Study are three groups of publications written by Japanese officers, prepared by the Military History Section of the Headquarters, US Army Forces East, and distributed by the Office of the Chief of Military History, US Department of the Army. They have been described as: "An invaluable tool for the English-speaking audience to research Japan's version of the war [World War II] in China".

== Background ==
=== Japanese Monographs ===
The Japanese Monographs are a series of operational histories, written by former officers of the Japanese army and navy, of Japanese actions in China during World War II. The 187 monographs were prepared under the direction of General Headquarters of the U.S. Far East Command beginning in 1945.

Much of the series was extensively revised, some of it completely rewritten, to correct errors of both English and fact, mainly in the period 1955-1960. During this period, the "Japanese Studies on Manchuria" were added.

=== Japanese Studies on Manchuria ===
"The Japanese Studies on Manchuria were prepared several years after the operational monographs and were written under the direction and guidance of the Japanese consultants of the Japanese Research Division. In general, these studies are superior to the monographs in organization, accuracy, and coverage."

=== Japanese Night Combat Study ===
In addition to editing and rewriting the monographs and Manchurian studies, the Japanese Research Division also prepared a special study on night combat as practiced by the Japanese Army. The latter was titled Japanese Night Combat Study.

== List of monographs ==
No.	Monograph	Subtitle	Period	Type	Service
1	Philippines Operations Record	Phase I	(November 1941 - June 1942)	Invasion operation	Army
2	Philippines Operations Record	Phase I	(December 1941 - April 1942)	Invasion operation	Army
3	Philippines Operations Record	Phase III	(December 1942 - June 1944)	Defense preparation	Army
4	Philippines Operations Record	Phase III	(July - November 1944)	Defense preparation	Army
5	Philippines Operations Record	Phase III	(July - December 1944)	Defense operations	Army
6	Philippines Operations Record	Phase III	(June 1944 - August 1945)	Defense operations	Army
7	Philippines Operations Record	Phase III	(January - August 1945)	Defense operations	Army
8	Philippines Operations Record	Phase III	(December 1944 - August 1945)	Defense operations	Army
9	Philippines Operations Record	Phase III	(December 1944 - August 1945)	Defense operations	Army
10	Philippines Operations Record	Phase III	(November 1944 - April 1945)	Defense operations	Army
11	Philippines Air Operations Record	Phase I	(December 1944 - May 1942)	Invasion operations	Army Air Force
12	Philippines Air Operations Record	Phase III	(August 1944 - February 1945)	Defense operations	Army Air Force
13	North of Australia Operations Record		(1943 - 1945)	Defense operations	Army
14	Second Area Army Operations in the Western New Guinea Area		(May 1944 - January 1945)	Defense operations	Army
15	Outline of the Battle for Morotai		(15 September - 13 May 1945)	Defense operations	Army
16	Ambon (Amboina) and Timor Invasion operations		(January - February 1942)	Invasion operations	Army
17	Homeland Operations Record		(1941-1945)		Army
18	Homeland Operations Record	Volume II	Combined with No. 17		
19	Homeland Operations Record	Volume III	Combined with No. 17		
20	Homeland Operations Record	Volume III supplement	Combined with No. 17		
21	Homeland Operations Record	Volume IV; Fifth Area Army	(Late 1943 - 1945)	Defense preparations	Army
22	Seventeenth Area Army Operations		(1941 - 1945)	Plans and preparations	Army
23	Air Defense of the Homeland		(1944 - 1945)	Defense operations	Army Air Force
24	History of the Southern Army		(1941 - 1945)	Over-all southern area operations	Army
25	French Indo-China Area Operations Record		(1940 - 1945)	General coverage	Army
26	Borneo Operations		(1941 - 1945)	General coverage	Army
27	Jolo Island Invasion operations Record		(December 1941)	Invasion operations	Army
28	Tarakan Invasion operations Record		(January 1942)	Invasion operations	Army
29	Balikpapan Invasion operations Record		(January 1942)	Invasion operation	Army
30	Bandjermasin Invasion Operations Record		(February 1942)	Invasion operation	Army
31	Southern Area Air Operations Record		(1941 - 1945)	General coverage	Army Air Force
32	Southern Area Air Operations Record		(November 1942 - April 1944)	Defense preparations	Army Air Force
33	Southeast Area Operations Record	Part 1 South Seas Detachment Operations	(3 January - 30 May 1942)	Invasion operations	Army
34	Southeast Area Operations Record	Volume I	(May 1942 - January 1943)	Counteroffensive	Army
35	Southeast Area Operations Record	Volume II	(February 1943 - August 1945)	Defense operations	Army
36	Southeast Area Operations Record	Map Supplement	Deleted; Maps combined with Nos. 34 and 35		Army
37	Southeast Area Operations Record; 18th Army Operations	Volume I	(January 1942 - June 1943)	Invasion operations	Army
38	Southeast Area Operations Record; 18th Army Operations	Volume II	(June 1943 - February 1944)	Defense operations	Army
39	Southeast Area Operations Record; 18th Army Operations	Volume III	(March 1944 - August 1944)	Defense operations	Army
40	Southeast Area Operations Record; 18th Army Operations	Volume IV	(September 1944 - June 1945)	Defense operations	Army
41	Southeast Area Operations Record; 18th Army Operations	Volume V	(June 1945 - March 1946)	Defense operations	Army
42	Southeast Area Operations Record; 18th Army Operations	Chart Supplement	(1943-1945)	Defense operations	Army
43	Southeast Area Operations Record; 18th Army Operations	Map Supplement	Deleted, maps combined with 37-41		
44	History of the Eighth Area Army		(November 1952 - August 1945)	Defense operations	Army
45	History of Imperial General HQ, Army Section		(1941 - 1945)	Over-all operations	Army
46	Aleutians Operations Record		(June 1942 - July 1943)	Invasion and Defense operations	Army
47	Northern Area Monthly Combat Reports		(January - May 1943)	Defense operations	Army
48	Central Pacific Operations Record	Volume I	(December 1941 - August 1945)	Invasion and Defense operations	Army
49	Central Pacific Operations Record	Volume II	(April - November 1944)	Defense operations	Army
50	Central Pacific Air Operations Record		(1944 - 1945)	Defense operations	Army Air Force
51	Iwo Jima and Ryukyu Islands Air Operations		(February - June 1945)	Defense operations	Army Air Force
52	Formosa Area Operations Record		(1943 - 1945)	Defense operations	Army
53	3rd Army Operations in Okinawa		(March - June 1945)	Defense operations	Army
54	Malay Operations Record		(November 1941 - March 1942)	Invasion operations	Army
55	Southeast Area Air Operations Record	Phase I	(November 1941 - February 1942)	Invasion operations	Army Air Force
56	Southeast Area Air Operations Record	Phase II	(July 1942 - June 1944)	Offensive operations	Army Air Force
57	Burma Operations Record	Phase I	(November 1941 - December 1942)	Invasion operations	Army
58	Burma Operations Record	Phase II	(1943 — 1944)	Offensive operations	Army
59a	Burma Operations Record	Phase III	(1944 - 1945)	Defense operations	Army
59b	Burma Operations Record	Phase III	(April 1944 - August 1945)	Defense operations	Army
60a	Burma Operations Record	Map Supplement	Deleted - combined with No. 57		Army
60b	Burma Operations Record	Map Supplement	Deleted - combined with No. 58		Army
61	Burma Operations Record	Supplement No. 2	(October - November 1943)	Defense operations	Army
62	Burma Operations Record	Supplement No. 2	(April 1944 - January 1945)	Defense operations	Army
63	Burma Operations Record	Map Supplement	Deleted - maps included with No. 62		Army
64	Burma Air Operations Record		(January 1942 - August 1945)	Over-all operations	Army Air Force
65	Southeast Area Air Operations Record	Phase III	(July 1944 - August 1945)	Defense operations	Army Air Force
66	The Invasion of the Netherlands East Indies		(November 1941 - March 1942)	Invasion operations	Army
67	Palembang and Bangka Islands Operations Record		(January - February 1942)	Invasion operations	Army
68	Report On Installations and Captured Weapons, Java and Singapore		1942		Army
69	Java-Sumatra Area Air Operations Record		(December 1941 - March 1942)	Invasion operations	Army Air Force
70	China Area Operations Record	(Revised)	(July 1937 - November 1941)	Invasion operations	Army
71	Army Operations in China		(December 1941 - December 1943)	Offensive operations	Army
72	Army Operations in China		(January 1944 - August 1945)	Offensive operations	Army
73	Combat in the Tao-Erh-Chuang Area		(February - June 1938)	Offensive operations	Army
74	Operations in the Kun-Lun-Kuan Area		(November 1939 - February 1940)	Offensive operations	Army
75	Operations at Changsha		Deleted - contents included in No. 70		
76	AIR OPERATIONS IN THE CHINA AREA		(July 1937 - August 1945)	Over-all coverage	Army Air Force
77	Japanese preparations for Operations in Manchuria		(1931–1942)	Plans and preparations	Army
78	The Kwantung Army in the Manchurian Campaign		(1941–1945)	Plans and preparations	Army
79	Burma and Andaman Invasion Naval Operations		(March - April 1942)	Invasion operations	Navy
79A	Sumatra Invasion and Southwest Area Naval Mopping-Up Operations		(January - May 1942)	Invasion operations	Navy
80	Operational Situation of the Japanese Navy in the Philippines Invasion Operations		(December 1941)	Invasion operations	Naval Air Force
81	Philippines Area Naval Operations	Part III	(December 1944 - January 1945)	Defense operations	Navy
82	Philippines Area Naval Operations	Part I	(January - September 1944)	Defense preparations	Naval Air Force
83	Okinawa Area Naval Operations		(January - June 1945)	Defense operations	Naval Air Force
84	Philippines Area Naval Operations	Part II	(October - December 1944)	Defense preparations	Navy
85	Preparations for Operations in Defense of the Homeland		(July 1944 - July 1945)	Plans and preparations	Navy
86	5th Air Fleet Operations		(February - August 1945)	Defense operations	Naval Air Force
87	Western New Guinea and North of Australia Area Naval Operations		(April - September 1944)	Defense operations	Navy
88	Aleutian Naval Operations		(March 1942 - February 1943)	Offensive operations	Navy
89	Northern Area Naval Operations		(February 1943 - August 1945)	Defense operations	Navy
90	The "A-Go" Operations		(May - June 1944)	Defense operations	Navy
91	The "A-Go" Operations	LOG, supplement	(May - June 1944)	Defense operations	Navy
92	Southwest Area Naval Operations		(April 1942 - April 1944)	Consolidation	Navy
93	Midway Operations		(May - June 1942)	Offensive operations	Navy
94	Iwo Jima Operation		(February - March 1945)	Defense operations	Naval Air Force
95	Submarine Operations in the Philippines Area		(September 1944 - March 1945)	Defense operations	Navy
96	Eastern New Guinea Invasion Operations		(March - September 1942)	Invasion operations	Navy
97	Pearl Harbor Operations: General Outline of Orders and Plans		(5 November - 2 December 1941)	Offensive operations	Navy
98	Southeast Area Naval Operations	Part I		Defense operations	Navy
99	Southeast Area Naval Operations	Part II	(February - October 1943)	Defense operations	Navy
100	Southeast Area Naval Operations	Part III	(October 1943 - February 1944)	Defense operations	Naval Air Force
101	Naval Operations in the Invasion of Netherlands East Indies		(December 1941 - March 1942)	Invasion operation	Navy
102	Submarine Operations		(December 1941 - April 1942)	Offensive operations	Navy
103	Outline of Administration in Occupied Areas		(1942 - 1945)	Consolidation	Army
104	Sources of Materials Used in Preparation of Japanese Monographs				Army
105	General Summary of Naval Operations	Southern Force	(November 1941 - April 1942)	Offensive operations	Navy
106	Naval Operations Against Soviet Russia		(1941 - 1945)	Plans and preparations	Navy
107	Malaya Invasion Naval Operations	(Revised)	(December 1941 - February 1942)	Invasion operations	Navy
108	Submarine Operations in First Phase Operations		(December 1941 - April 1942)	Offensive operations	Navy
109	Homeland Defense Naval Operations	Part I	(December 1941 - March 1943)	Plans and preparation	Navy
110	Submarine Operations in Second Phase Operations	Part I	(April - August 1942)	Offensive operations	Navy
111	Submarine Operations in Second Phase Operations	Part II	(August 1942 - March 1943)	Defense operations	Navy
112	Southeast Area Naval Operations	Part IV	(February - April 1944)	Defense operations	Navy
113	Task Force Operations		(November 1941 - April 1942)	Offensive Operation	Naval Air Force
114	Philippine Area Naval Operations	Part IV	(January - August 1945)	Defense operations	Navy
115	Borneo Area Naval Operation		(February - July 1945)	Defense operations	Navy
116	The Imperial Japanese Navy in World War II		(1941 - 1945)		Navy
117	Outline of Third Phase Operations		(February 1943 - August 1945)	Defense operations	Navy
118	Operational History of Naval Communications		(December 1941 - August 1945)		Navy
119	Outline of Operations prior to the Termination of War and activities connected with the Cessation of Hostilities		(July - August 1945)	Surrender	Navy
120	Outline of Southeast Area Naval Air Operations	Part I	(December 1941 - August 1942)	Invasion operations	Naval Air Force
121	Outline of Southeast Area Naval Air Operations	Part II	(August - October 1942)	Offensive operations	Naval Air Force
122	Outline of Southeast Area Naval Air Operations	Part III	(November 1942 - June 1943)	Defensive Operations	Naval Air Force
123	Homeland Defense Naval Operations	Part II	(March 1943 - August 1945)	Defense operations	Navy
124	Homeland Defense Naval Operations	Part III	(June 1944 - August 1945)	Defense operations	Naval Air Force
125	SURFACE ESCORT OPERATIONS		December 1941 - August 1945)	Over-all operations	Navy
126	BORNEO OPERATIONS RECORD	Volume II	Deleted - material included in No. 26		
127	Southeast Area Operations Record	Part IV	(November 1942 - August 1945)	Defense operations	Army
128	Southeast Area Operations Record	Supplement, Part IV	(September 1943 - April 1944)	Defense operations	Army
129	China Area Operations Record	Command of the China Expeditionary Army	(August 1943 - August 1945)	Offensive operations	Army
130	Burma Operations Record	Sixth Area Army Operations	(July 1944 - August 1945)	Offensive operations	Army
131	Burma Operations Record	Operations in Hukawng Area	(August 1943 - July 1944)	Defense operations	Army
132	Burma Operations Record	28th Army Operations in Akyab Area	(November 1943 - September 1945)	Defense operations	Army
133	Burma Operations Record	Outline of Burma Area Line of Communications	(1943 - 1945)	Logistic Operations	Army
134	Burma Operations Record	15th Army Operations in Imphal Area and Withdrawal to Northern Burma	(January 1943 - January 1945)	Over-all operations	Army
135	Okinawa Operations Record		(March - June 1945)	Defense operations	Army
136	North of Australia Operations Record		(January 1944 - August 1945)	Defense operations	Army
137	Philippines Operations Record	Phase III, Volume IV, General Outline of Mindoro Operations	(September 1944 - August 1945)	Defense operations	Army
138	Japanese preparations for Operations in Manchuria		(January, 1943 - August 1945)	Plans and preparations	Army
139	Outline of South Seas Naval Operations and General Situation		(December 1941 - March 1943)	Invasion operations	Navy
140	Outline of Southeast Area Naval Air Operations	Part IV	(July - November 1943)	Offensive operations	Naval Air Force
141	Okinawa Area Naval Operations	Supplement	(January - August 1945)	Deleted, combined with No. 83.	
142	Outline of Southeast Area Naval Air Operations	Part V	(December 1943 - May 1944)	Defense operations	Naval Air Force
143	Southeast Area Operations Record	Part I	(January - May 1942)	Invasion operations	Army
144	Political Strategy Prior to Outbreak of War	Part I	(September 1931 - January 1940)		
145	Outline of Naval Armament and Preparations for War	Part I	(1922 - 1934)	Plans and preparations	Navy
146	Political Strategy Prior to Outbreak of War	Part II	(January - December 1940)		
147	Political Strategy Prior to Outbreak of War	Part III	(January - December 1941)		
148	Burma Area Operations Record	33rd Army Operations	(April 1944 - August 1945)	Defense operations	Army
149	Outline of Naval Armament and Preparations for War	Part II	(1934 - 1939)	Plans and preparations	Navy
150	Political Strategy Prior to Outbreak of War	Part IV	(January - December 1941)		
151	Air Operations Record Against Soviet Russia		(June 1941 - September 1945)	Plans and preparations	Army Air Force
152	Political Strategy Prior to Outbreak of War	Part V	(1940 - 1941)	Plans and preparations	Navy
153	Homeland Operations Record	Volume IV; Operations in Karafuto and China Area	(9–22 August 1945)	Defense operations	Army
154	Record of Operations against Soviet Russia	Eastern Front	(August 1945)	Defense operations	Army
155	Record of Operations against Soviet Russia	Northern and Western Fronts	(August - September 1945)	Defense operations	Army
156	Historical Review of Landing Operations of Japanese Forces		(1904 - 1945)	Offensive operations	Army
157	Homeland Air Defense Operations Record	(Revised)	(July 1944 - August 1945)	Defense operations	Army Air Force
158	Homeland Air Defense Operations Record	CENTRAL SECTOR	Material included with No. 157		
159	Homeland Air Defense Operations Record	WESTERN SECTOR	Material included with No. 157		
160	Outline of Naval Armament and Preparations for War	Part III	(1939 -1941)	Plans and preparations	Navy
161	Inner South Sea Islands Area Naval Operations	Part I, Gilbert Islands	(November 1941 - November 1943)	Offensive operations	Navy
162	Southwest Area Operations Record		(April 1944 - August 1945)	Defense operations	Army
163	Submarine Operations in Third Phase Operations	Part I	(March - November 1943)	Offensive operations	Navy
164	Railway Operations Record		(1941 - 1945)	Transportation Operations	Army
165	Java Operations Record	Part II	(Early 1944 - August 1945)	Plans and preparations	Army
166	China Incident Naval Air Operations		(July - November 1937)	Offensive operations	Naval Air Force
167	Malay Operations Record		(January 1944 - August 1945)	Defense preparations	Army
168	Homeland Antiaircraft Defense Operations Record	Tokai Sector	(December 1944 - August 1945)	Defense preparations	Army
169	Outline of Naval Armament and Preparations for War	Part IV	(1942)	Naval Construction	Navy
170	Homeland Antiaircraft Defense Operations Record	Kanto Sector	(June 1944 - August 1945)	Defense preparations	Army
171	Submarine Operations in Third Phase Operations	Part II	(November 1943 - March 1944)	Offensive operations	Navy
172	Outline of Naval Armament and Preparations for War	Part V	(March 1943 - April 1945)	Naval Construction	Navy
173	Inner South Seas Islands Area Naval Operations	Part II Marshall Islands	(December 1941 - February 1944)	Defense operations	Navy
174	Outline of Naval Armament and Preparations for War	Part VI	(March - June 1945)	Defense operations	Navy
175	Homeland Antiaircraft Defense Operations Record	Central Sector	(September 1944 - July 1945)	Defense preparations	Army
176	Homeland Antiaircraft Defense Operations Record	Western Sector	(June 1944 - August 1945)	Defense preparations	Army
177	Thailand Operations Record		(1941 - 1945)	Over-all operations	Army
178	China Area Operations Record	North China	(July 1937 - May 1941)	Offensive operations	Army
179	China Area Operations Record	Central China	(1937 - 1941)	Offensive operations	Army
180	China Area Operations Record	South China	(1937 - 1941)	Offensive operations	Army
181
182
183
184	Submarine Operations in Third Phase Operations	Part III; Part IV; Part V	(March 1944 - August 1945)	Defense operations	Navy
185	Sumatra Operations Record	25th Army	(March 1942 - August 1945)	Over-all operations	Army

== List of studies on Manchuria ==
Vol.	Study
I	Japanese Operational Planning against the USSR (1932–1945)
II	Imperial Japanese Army in Manchuria (1894–1945) Historical Summary
III	Strategic Study On Manchuria Military Topography and Geography Terrain Study
IV	Air Operations (1931–1945) Plans and Preparations
V	Infantry Operations
VI	Armor Operations
VII	Supporting Arms and Services
VIII	Logistics in Manchuria
IX	Climatic Factors
X	Japanese Intelligence Planning against the USSR (1934–1941)
XI	Small Wars and Border Problems
XII	Anti-Bandit Operation (1931–1941)
XIII	Study of Strategic and Tactical Peculiarities of Far Eastern Russia and Soviet Eastern Forces (1931–1945)
