= Lewis Reeve Gibbes =

19th-century American chemist

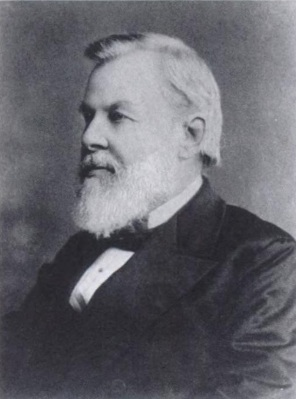
- Born: 14 August 1810; Charleston, South Carolina
- Died: November 21, 1894 (aged 84); Charleston, South Carolina
- Education: College of South Carolina, Medical College of South Carolina
- Scientific career
- Fields: Biology, Chemistry
- Workplaces: College of Charleston

Lewis Reeve Gibbes (August 14, 1810–November 21, 1894) was an American professor of mathematics, chemistry, physics, and astronomy at the College of Charleston. He is remembered for his Catalogue of the Phoenogamous Plants of Columbia, S.C., and Its Vicinity (1835) as well as his "Synoptical Table of the Chemical Elements," worked out between 1870 and 1874 and published in 1875.

Gibbes was born in Charleston on August 14, 1810 to Ladson Gibbes and Maria Henrietta Drayton Gibbes, the eldest of their eight children. After attending grammar school in Charleston and Philadelphia, he attended pre-college at the Pendleton Academy and, following his graduation in 1827, enrolled in South Carolina College, which had been founded by the state in 1801 and which would later evolve into the University of South Carolina. In 1830, he briefly taught classics and served as principal at Pendleton Academy, and later during this same year, he enrolled in the Medical College of South Carolina back in Charleston. The next year, in 1831, he returned to Columbia and began teaching mathematics at the College of South Carolina.

It was during this time that Gibbes began his important studies on phoenogamous plants (see terminology of plant reproductive morphology), which would lead to his publication several years later of his catalog listing approximately 775 species of plants (other sources record that this publication delineated about 900 species). His early research in this geographical region has continued to influence later generations of botanists, and today, a small collection is still housed at the Gibbes herbarium at the Charleston Museum.

In 1836, Gibbes submitted a prize-winning thesis in French to the medical faculty and was awarded his degree. He then travelled to Paris and undertook a course of studies in chemistry that would influence his later significant research. He attended the lectures of Joseph Louis Gay-Lussac and Michel Eugène Chevreul at the Jardin des Plantes, as well as those of Jean-Baptiste Dumas and Claude Pouillet at the Sorbonne, and also those of Pierre Louis Dulong at the École Polytechnique.

He became professor of mathematics and history at the College of Charleston in 1838, while also continuing his work collecting biological specimen. During these years, Gibbes described two new species of salamander, the Salamandra melanosticta (1844) and the Menobranchus punctatus (1850). Because of his expertise, fellow naturalist John Bachman is known to have requested Gibbes' help for devising Latinized names during the drafting of his Quadrupeds of North America (1845-1848). When Louis Agassiz worked with Gibbes on the classification of American crabs, he would compliment him with the statement that "of the larger ones [Crustacea] there is nothing to be found after Professor Gibbes has gone over the ground."

Following the American Civil War, he was able to return to teaching, although financial difficulties prevented him from keeping abreast of the publications and research of Dmitri Mendeleev and Julius Lothar Meyer. Independent, therefore, of these European chemists, did Gibbes assemble his "Synoptical Table" during the years 1870-1874, in which he attempted to format in a unified chart as many as possible of the several different types of relationships found among the elements.

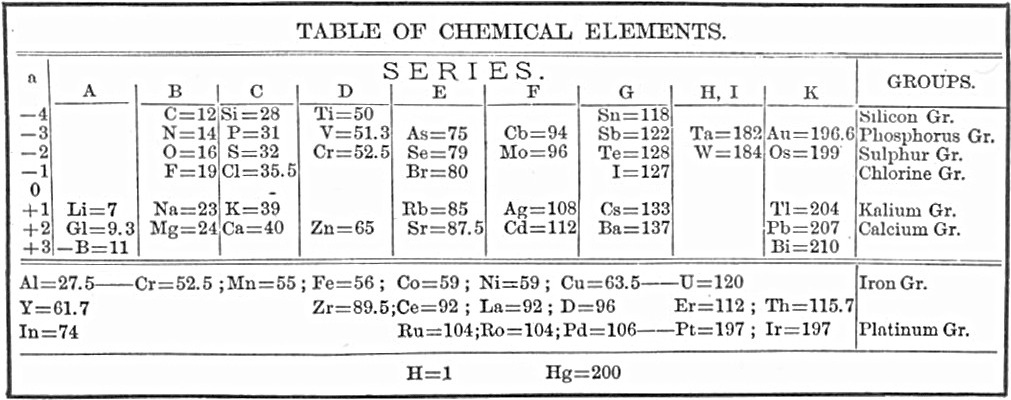
Lewis Reeve Gibbes' "Synoptical Table" (1875)

W.H. Taylor, a historian of chemistry at Princeton University, noted the following of Gibbes' work:

"Guided by the order of succession which he had observed, Gibbes made several changes in the arrangement which would have been the consequence of following [ed: George Frederick] Barker's tables slavishly. With considerable chemical insight, Gibbes utilized his knowledge of isomorphism and other properties in placing vanadium, columbium, tantalum, chromium, and boron in the pigeon-holes now so familiar to chemists. In this way he placed in the main body of the chart, which corresponds closely with the skeleton of our present short form of the Periodic Table, forty one of the sixty-three elements known in 1874. Of these, all but five—his Series K—were correctly located, and even where his fragmentary knowledge of some of the heavy elements misled him, Gibbes grasped the correct general outline."

In addition to his "Synoptical Table," Gibbes' publication of 1875 attempted another division of the elements according to an Archimedean spiral. Such an arrangement followed upon the earlier suggestions of Alexandre-Émilede Chancourtois and Mendeleev and also anticipated a similar pattern described by William Crookes in 1886. This spiral pattern of the elements has been noted by historians as suggestive of chemical evolution from the more primal matter within stars.

Gibbes' personal papers numbering over 5,000 items can be found at the Library of Congress in Washington, DC.
