= Michael Amiridis =

American academic

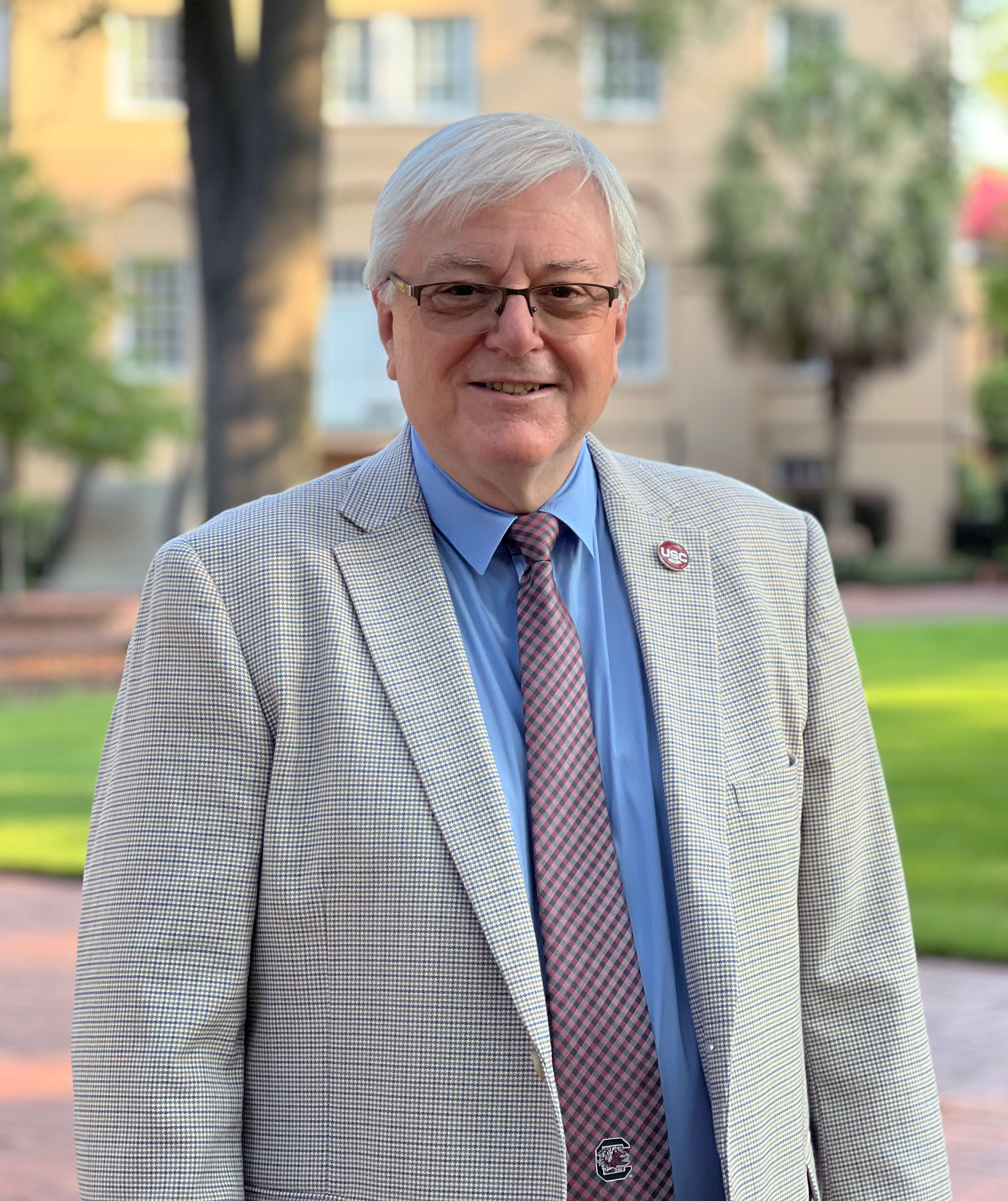
- Amiridis in 2023

30th President of the University of South Carolina
- Incumbent
- Assumed office July 1, 2022
- Preceded by: Harris Pastides

7th Chancellor of the University of Illinois, Chicago
- In office March 16, 2015 – July 1, 2022
- Preceded by: Eric Gislason (interim); Paula Allen-Meares
- Succeeded by: Javier Reyes (interim); Marie Lynn Miranda

Personal details
- Born: 1963 (age 62–63) Kavala, Greece
- Spouse: Ero Aggelopoulou-Amiridis
- Children: 2
- Education: University of Thessaloniki (BS); University of Wisconsin, Madison (MS, PhD)
- Scientific career
- Fields: Chemical engineering
- Workplaces: W. R. Grace and Company; Johns Hopkins University; University of South Carolina; University of Illinois Chicago
- Thesis: Selective catalytic reduction of nitric oxide by ammonia over iron exchanged yttrium zeolites (1991)
- Doctoral advisor: James Dumesic

Michael Amiridis is a Greek-American academic who serves as the 30th president of the University of South Carolina. Prior to this position, he served as chancellor of the University of Illinois Chicago from 2015 to 2022.

== Early life and education ==
Amiridis was born in 1962 in Kavala, Greece. He is the elder of the two sons of the late Dimitri and Aspasia Amiridis. Before migrating to the United States, he attended the Aristotelian University of Thessaloniki. Amiridis earned his Ph.D. in chemical engineering from the University of Wisconsin-Madison in 1991 and became a U.S. citizen in 2000.

== Early career ==
For three years after earning his Ph.D., Amiridis worked as a research engineer at W.R. Grace and Co., an international manufacturer of specialty chemicals and materials, in Columbia, Maryland, and taught for a semester at Johns Hopkins University in Baltimore. He left the private sector in 1994 and accepted a position as assistant professor of chemical engineering at the University of South Carolina.

== Academic administration ==
Amiridis began his academic career at the University of South Carolina as a chemical engineering professor. He was promoted to associate professor with tenure in 1999, took a year-long sabbatical at the University of Poitiers in France and the Swiss Federal Institute of Technology (ETH) in Zurich, and was promoted to professor in 2003. At USC, he became chair of Chemical Engineering in 2002, dean of Engineering and Computing in 2006 — while he was the college's youngest faculty member at the rank of professor — and USC's executive vice president for academic affairs and provost from 2009 to 2015. Amiridis was appointed chancellor of the University of Illinois Chicago in 2015, a position he held until resigning in 2022 to become the 30th president of the University of South Carolina. On July 1, 2022, Amiridis succeeded Harris Pastides as president. Pastides had served as president from 2008 to 2019 and again as interim president from 2021 to 2022 following the resignation of Robert Caslen. Amiridis was elected unanimously by the USC Board of Trustees.

During Amiridis' first years as president, USC has seen record growth in student applications for admission, student enrollment, internal research grants, and fundraising dollars, with significant donor investments that led to the naming of four USC colleges from 2023 through 2026: the Joseph F. Rice School of Law, the Molinaroli College of Arts and Sciences, the McCausland College of Arts and Sciences, and the Kay and C. Edward Floyd, M.D. School of Medicine.

As provost at USC, Amiridis led efforts for growth in student enrollment, with significant improvement in the quality of the undergraduate class. He initiated an ambitious faculty hiring program, creating 200 new tenure positions in a four-year period, and developed an academic dashboard to monitor success. Under his leadership, new university-wide programs were implemented, including Palmetto College, the new Carolina Core curriculum, and Global Carolina. He also led the process to create the USC School of Medicine in Greenville.

During Amiridis' tenure as chancellor of the University of Illinois Chicago, UIC achieved historic highs in student enrollments (34,000) and annual research awards ($450 million), initiated an ambitious capital program to renew its infrastructure, initiated and completed a $750 million capital campaign, and acquired the John Marshall School of Law, which became the first public law school in the history of Chicago. He also served on the board of directors of the Chicago Council on Global Affairs and the Chicagoland Chamber of Commerce and was appointed by governor-elect J.B. Pritzker to his Educational Transition Committee.

== Awards and honors ==
In 1996, Amiridis won National Science Foundation's award for early-career scientists and engineers. He has received numerous teaching awards, including the Michael J. Mungo Undergraduate and Graduate Teaching Awards and USC's Samuel Litman Distinguished Professor Award. As a researcher, he earned the National Science Foundation's CAREER award in 1996, the USC College of Engineering and Computing Research Achievement Award in 2005, and the University of Wisconsin Marshall Founders’ Lecture Award in 2014. With over $15 million in research funding as principal investigator and 110 peer-reviewed journal publications, he was elected a fellow of the American Association for the Advancement of Science in 2012 and of the American Institute of Chemical Engineers in 2015.

Active at the national level, Amiridis was elected to the boards of the Hispanic Association of Colleges and Universities (HACU) and Urban Serving Universities (USU), where he is the current chair. In October 2022, HACU honored him with the President's Award of Excellence for his efforts to diversify UIC's senior leadership and to create opportunities for Hispanic students. HACU also recognized Amiridis’ national initiative to create the Alliance of Hispanic-Serving Research Universities.

He was awarded an honorary doctoral degree in materials science and engineering from the University of Ioannina in Greece in 2017. In July 2022, Amiridis was named to a list of "Great Immigrants" by the Carnegie Corporation of New York.

Amiridis ranked number 3 on the Post and Courier Columbia's 2025 Power List.

In September 2026, Amiridis was honored by Greek Prime Minister Kyriakos Mitsotakis with a Medal of Honor recognizing his achievements, his contributions to the Greek-American community and his commitment to Greek heritage and culture.
