= Night combat =

Combat that occurs during the hours of darkness

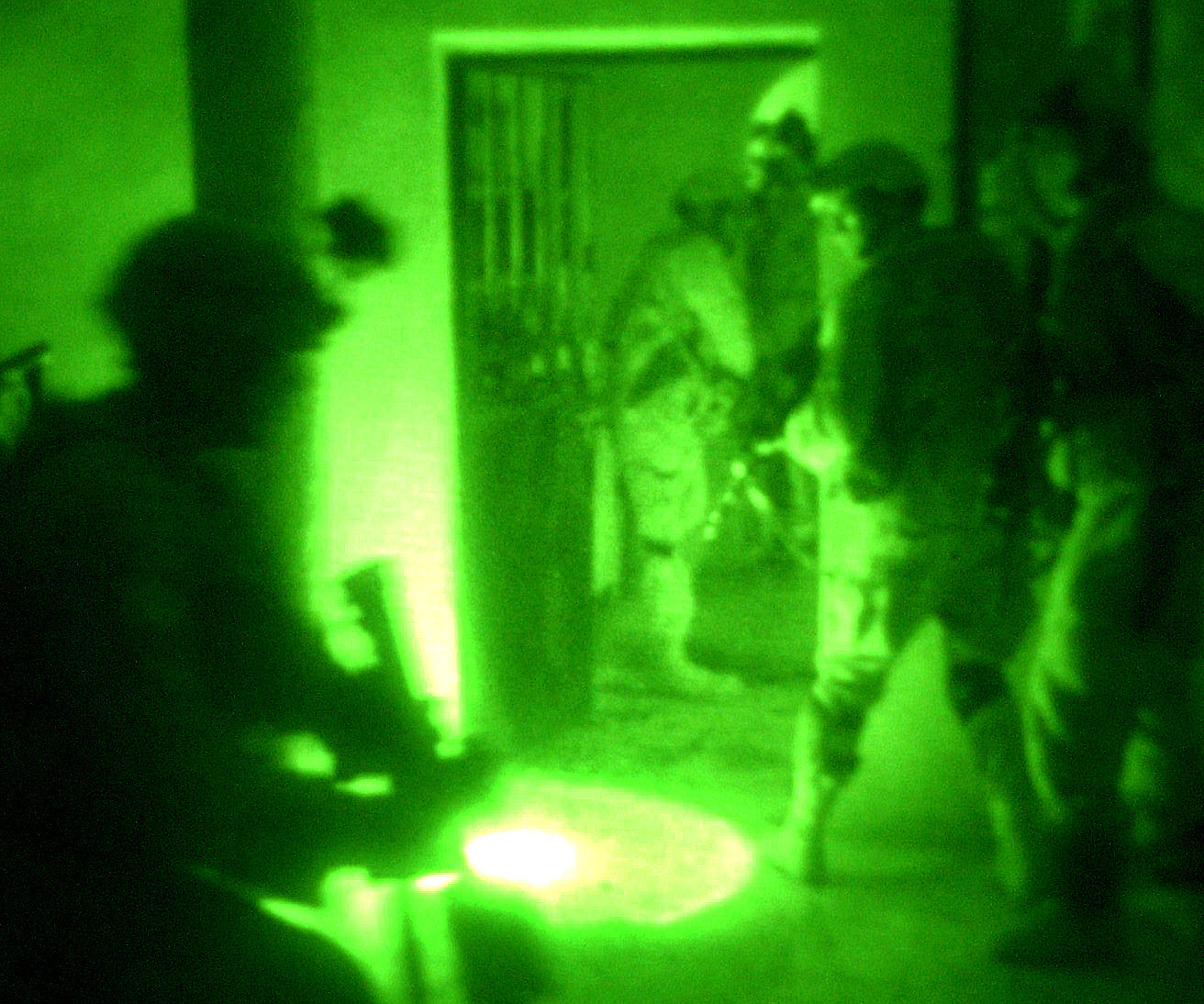
Paratroopers in Fallujah, Iraq conduct a night raid using night vision goggles in 2003

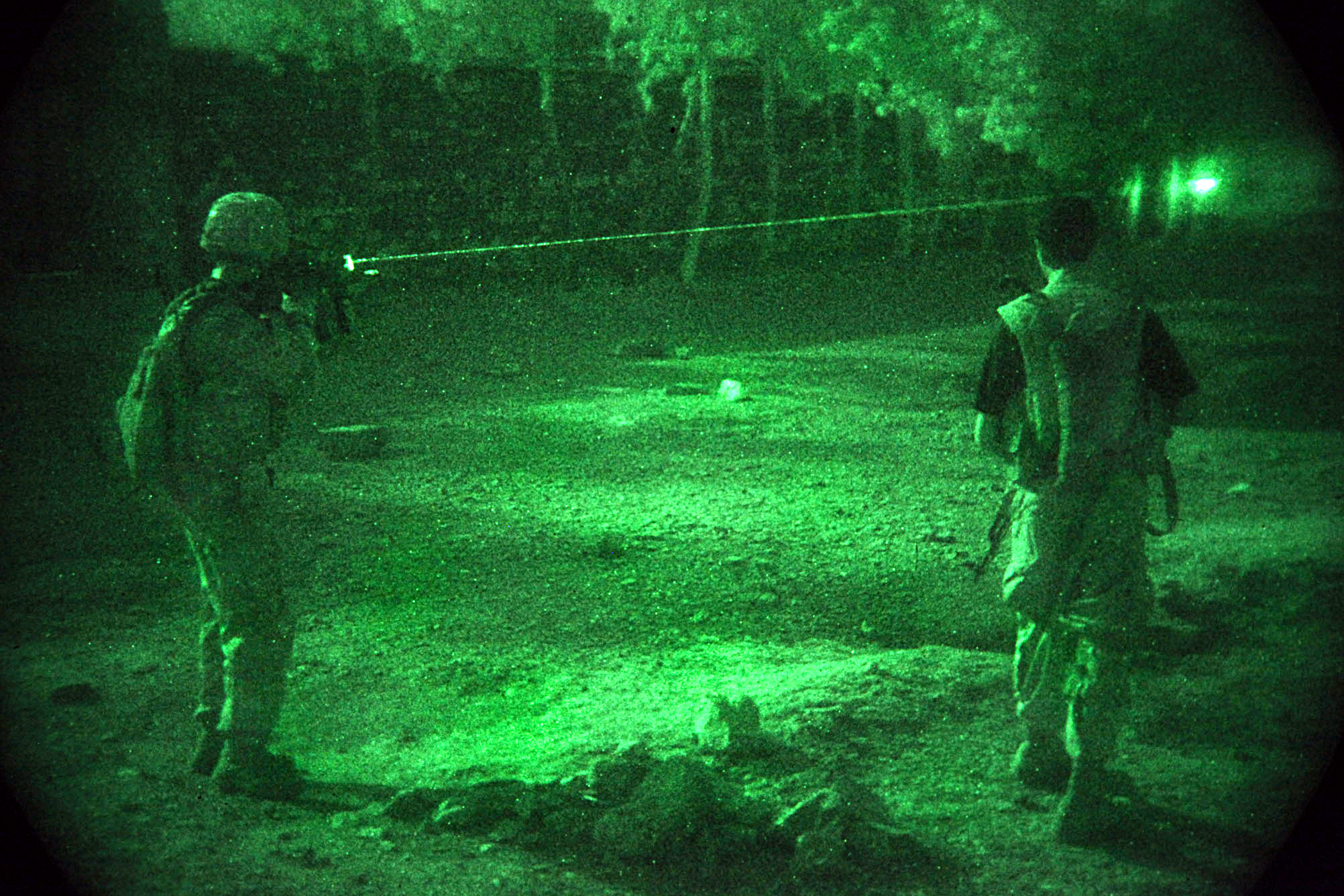
Seen through a night vision device, United States Army Sergeant Andrew Burch and an Afghan soldier scan a tree line for militants with an IR laser sight during Operation Champion Sword in 2009

Night combat is combat that occurs during the hours of darkness. It is distinguished from daytime combat by lower visibility and its reversed relation to the circadian cycle. Typically, night combat is favorable to the attacker, with offensive tactics being focused on exploiting the advantages to maximum effect. Defensive night tactics mainly focus on negating the advantages given by the night to the attacker.

== Effects of night ==
The most obvious effect of darkness is reduced visibility. This affects a soldier's ability to observe friendly troop movements, understand terrain, and especially affects perception of enemy movements and positions. Officers find that darkness hampers many aspects of command, including their ability to preserve control, execute movement, firing, maintenance of direction, reconnaissance, security, and mutual support. A U.S. Army report on the history of Japanese warfare described an instance of this confusion:

An example is recorded in the history of Japan when about 1180 a force [sic] of the Heike confronting a force of the Genji across the Fuji river (Shizuoka Prefecture) beat a hasty retreat one night due to mistaking the noise made by water fowl for an attacking Genji force.

Indeed, a side effect of the reduced visibility is heightened audibility, as soldiers focus more on what they can hear. There are many instances of soldiers losing their bearings at night due to flashes from guns or enemy searchlights. The difficulties of perception lend themselves to fear of the unknown. Soldiers under fire can't tell where the fire originates and can't devise appropriate countermeasures. Such uncertainty is associated with feelings of loneliness and helplessness, and creates a tendency to overestimate enemy strength or be excessively pessimistic of the combat situation.

In addition, without the aid of artificial illumination, a soldier's marksmanship is negatively affected in total darkness. According to a report by Jean L. Dyer, Seward Smith and Nancy R. McClure,

Prior to the introduction of aided night vision devices, effective firing at night with a rifle was limited to very close distances, typically within 50 meters. The ability to hit targets was dependent upon a soldier's ability to acquire targets in their sights, which in turn, depended greatly upon the amount of natural and artificial illumination.

== History ==
Night operations have been subject to vast shifts in effectiveness and frequency throughout history, as tactics and technology became more sophisticated.

=== Classical antiquity ===
Night fighting between standing armies was rare in ancient times. Night logistics were mostly limited to the carrying of torches or navigation by what little light was provided by the stars or moon. However, circumstances occasionally necessitated fighting at night.

The biblical account of Abraham's mission to rescue his nephew Lot, captured at the Battle of Siddim in Genesis 14, states that he undertook a night time maneouvre in order to surprise Lot's captors.

Usually due to the massive nature of the battles, they could not be resolved in one day, and combat could not be cleanly disengaged as darkness fell, or prevented as armies camped near each other overnight. Sieges which lasted for weeks, months or, even years were often fought day and night. Below are a few notable examples.

Ancient historian Diodorus claims that at the Battle of Thermopylae the Spartans attempted to assassinate Persian King Xerxes by infiltrating his camp at night.

"They immediately seized their arms, and six hundred men rushed into the camp of five hundred thousand, making directly for the king's tent, and resolving either to die with him, or, if they should be overpowered, at least in his quarters. An alarm spread through the whole Persian army. The Spartans being unable to find the king, marched uncontrolled through the whole camp, killing and overthrowing all that stood in their way, like men who knew that they fought, not with the hope of victory, but to avenge their own deaths. The contest was protracted from the beginning of the night through the greater part of the following day. At last, not conquered, but exhausted with conquering, they fell amidst vast heaps of slaughtered enemies."

At the Battle of the Teutoburg Forest, over a period of 3 days, an alliance of Germanic tribes wore down and eventually annihilated 3 Roman legions (about 16,000 to 20,000 men). The Romans attempted several defensive night tactics. On the first night they managed to erect a fortified camp. On the second night, they marched at night in an attempt to break through the encircling Germanic forces, but the Germans had already built a wall in their way, and when combat resumed the following day, the Romans were defeated.

The Battle of the Catalaunian Plains saw exceptional chaos caused by nightfall. The night before the battle proper, one of the Roman allied forces stumbled on a band of Hunnic troops and in the resulting skirmish, as many as 30,000 (unverified) men were killed. Later in the battle, Thorismund, son of king Theodoric, accidentally walked into Attila the Hun's encampment while attempting to return to his own forces at night. He was wounded in the ensuing mêlée before his followers could rescue him and withdraw. That same night, the Roman commander Flavius Aëtius became separated from his men and, believing that disaster had befallen them, had to stay the night with his Germanic allies.

=== Early Modern ===
The Night Attack of Târgoviște pitted Vlad The Impaler of Wallachia against Mehmed II of the Ottoman Empire. Vlad reportedly disguised himself as a Turk and walked freely throughout the Ottoman camp in an effort to find Mehmed's tent and learn about the organization of his army. One chronicle of the battle says that Mehmed disallowed his troops to exit their tents so as not to cause a panic in case of an attack. According to that chronicle, Vlad learned of this and planned his attack at night knowing that the enemy soldiers would have to remain in their tents. Accounts of the battle and its casualties are mixed, but in the end it was a Wallachian victory, with around 5000 Wallachian casualties compared to around 15,000 for the Ottomans.

During the Great Siege of Gibraltar, Antonio Barceló choose dark nights to place his gunboats near to enemy land and bombard them without possibility of answering fire, as the boats were small enough not to produce any visible silouettes the British could fire against. The defenders initially attempted to aim for the muzzle flashes, but even this proved fruitless. In the 1800s, the Ashanti army sometimes, although seldom, fought at night. The Ashanti engaged in a night attack at Dodowa in 1826. The army was led by torch-carrying scouts.

=== World War I ===
The adoption of illumination rounds led to an improvement in the ability to carry out night operations. These projectiles were fired from howitzers and field guns in the direction their light was required. The first illumination rounds (also called starshell) were modified shrapnel shells which ejected magnesium pellets. These were somewhat ineffective, and were soon replaced by improved designs that had greater candle power, and a parachute to prolong the descent to ground. Tracer ammunition was also introduced during World War I. Tracers made marksmanship at night easier for soldiers because they could observe the trajectory of their shots and correct their aim accordingly.

=== World War II ===
Nighttime continued to have a significant impact on combat during World War II. Particularly in the Pacific Theater, the Japanese military was proficient in night warfare, as acknowledged by the Allies. In anticipation of a conflict with the Soviet Union, whose numbers of tanks, planes, and artillery were vastly superior, the Japanese developed a series of training manuals designed to counter these advantages. The "Red Books" (classified materials bound in red paper) emphasized the advantages of attacking at night, in the evening, and at dawn. These tactics later proved useful against the other Allies who were similarly better equipped.

The Japanese used this advantage to win engagements where they were severely outnumbered in China and against the Allies at sea. It wasn't until late in the war that early warning technologies of the Allies subverted their surprise attacks at night, reducing their effectiveness. These tactics completely broke down once the Japanese military replaced their well-trained troops with hastily trained recruits.

Another type of illumination device was the tripflare, consisting of a pyrotechnic instrument activated by tripwire, planted near trails to provide early warning of enemy movement. By 1944, the Wehrmacht was making extensive use of tripflares in Italy, after their perimeters had been repeatedly infiltrated at night by U.S. Army Rangers. Tripflares helped foil an attack launched by the Fifth Army on January 20 at the Rapido River.

=== Post-World War II ===
In the First Battle of al-Faw in 1986, during the late stages of the Iran–Iraq War, one of the elements that contributed to the success of Iranians was their use of dug-in infantry which would move only at night and during poor weather. This reduced the Iraqis' advantage in armor. The Iranian forces had been trained in night warfare prior to the battle.

== Tactics ==
Perhaps the most important deciding factor in a battle at night is preparation. This includes training, reconnaissance, and planning. As with any military operation, leadership is important in both the high-ranking officers and the low-level squad and unit leaders.

=== Offensive tactics ===
The decision to engage at night or continue an engagement at night is usually made by the attacking force. Combat continued at night is aimed at exploiting an advantage gained from an attack during the day or similarly denying the defending force the opportunity to regroup or reinforce. Combat initiated at night can either be aimed to gain an advantage (such as territory or prisoners) which is then held during the following day or to harass and demoralize the enemy before disengaging prior to sunrise. The latter case is considered a raid.

Historically, night combat involves greater risk and reward compared to similar battles in the daytime. Victories can be crushing, with the defending side taken completely by surprise and hardly firing a shot in response to the attack. Alternatively, defeats can be disastrous, with huge casualties resulting from attacking armies floundering chaotically while they themselves are ambushed in pitch darkness.

== See also ==
- Night vision
- Night vision device
