= Francis Wright Bradley =

American academic

Francis Wright Bradley (January 18, 1884 in Troy, Abbeville County, South Carolina, United States – December 18, 1971, Columbia, Richland County, South Carolina) was a Dean at the University of South Carolina, as well as a professor of languages, and acting University President in 1952.

In World War I he used his multi-linguistic talents as a translator in the Intelligence Unit of the U.S. Army, American Expeditionary Forces. For this he was rapidly promoted and awarded several decorations.

Bradley, Francis Wright, Appt 1 Lt. AGD Aug. 15, 1917 fr CL capt. Nov. 6, 1918; Maj. May 30, 1919. Statistical Sec. AGD to Nov. 6, 1918; Corps of Interpreters to May 30, 1918; Inf to discharge France; Cp. Dix, N. J., Cp. Gordon, Ga., AEF May 11, 1918 to Sept. 20, 1919. Honorably discharged October 7, 1919. Awarded British Military Cross and Authorization Certificate. Awarded Belgian Croix de Guerre. Awarded French Legion of Honor (Chevalier) decoration and certificate. Awarded Italian Groee di Guerra.

He is still respected at the University of South Carolina, as evidenced by a scholarly award which bears his name.
