= Operation Champion Sword =

Joint military operation

Coordinates: 33.461°N 69.990°E

- Part of the War in Afghanistan (2001–2021)
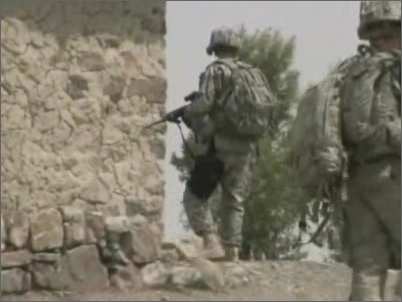
- A soldier on patrol in Afghanistan as part of the operation
Date	28 July 2009 – 5 August 2009
Location	Khost Province, Afghanistan
Result	Improvement of security in region; Capture of 14 militants and bomb-makers; Improvement of security before Afghan Election

Belligerents
United States: Combined Joint Task Force 82; 25th Infantry Division; Afghanistan	Taliban al-Qaeda; Other allied groups

Commanders and leaders
(United States) Stanley A. McChrystal (United States) Robert L. Caslen Jr.	(Taliban) Mohammed Omar (al-Qaeda) Osama bin Laden

Operation Champion Sword was a joint military operation by the forces of the United States and Afghanistan as part of an International Security Assistance Force against the Taliban and allies. Lasting for a week, the operation resulted in the capture of 14 militants and homemade bomb-makers, as well as improving the general security of Khost Province. The operation targeted safe havens and terrorist hideouts in the Sabari and Tere Zayi districts of Khost province.
