= James Rion McKissick =

American journalist and university president (1884–1944)

19th President of the University of South Carolina
- In office 1936–1944
- Preceded by: Leonard T. Baker
- Succeeded by: Norman Murray Smith

Personal details
- Born: October 13, 1884 Union, South Carolina, US
- Died: September 3, 1944 (aged 59) Columbia, South Carolina, US
- Resting place: The Horseshoe, University of South Carolina, Columbia, South Carolina
- Spouse: Caroline Virginia Dick
- Education: South Carolina College (BA); Harvard Law School; University of Wisconsin (MA)
- Profession: Journalist, educator
- Nickname: The Colonel

James Rion McKissick (October 13, 1884 – September 3, 1944) was an American journalist, educator and university administrator who served as the 19th president of the University of South Carolina from 1936 until his death in 1944. The university's McKissick Museum building carries his name.

== Early life and education ==
McKissick was born in Union, South Carolina, on October 13, 1884, the son of Isaac Going McKissick and Sarah Foster, and was raised at Pea Ridge, the family's country home. He entered South Carolina College in 1901 and began his career in journalism as an editor of the Carolinian and the Garnet and Black, the student publications.

After the annual "Big Thursday" football game between the South Carolina Gamecocks and Clemson Tigers in 1902, a drawing of a gamecock crowing over a defeated tiger prompted an armed standoff between Clemson cadets and Carolina students. According to a later account, McKissick was among the students who took up arms behind the walls of the university's Horseshoe. Police intervened before any shots were fired. While in college he was noted for his writing and oratory.

McKissick graduated in 1905 and attended Harvard Law School before turning to journalism.

== Journalism and law ==
At the Richmond (Va.) Times-Dispatch McKissick rose from reporter to chief editorial writer. He returned to South Carolina in 1914, was admitted to the bar and practised law until 1916, when he became editor of the Greenville News; in 1919 he moved to the Greenville Piedmont, where he was editor and publisher.

He was elected to the University of South Carolina's board of trustees in 1924 and joined the faculty in 1927 as dean of the School of Journalism, marrying Caroline Virginia Dick the same year. He took a master's degree in journalism from the University of Wisconsin while serving as dean. Although he held no doctorate, he was well regarded as a teacher, and his students gave him the nickname "the Colonel".

== Presidency ==
McKissick was chosen as president of the University of South Carolina in 1935 and took office the following year, becoming one of the few alumni of the institution to lead it. His presidency spanned the Great Depression and the Second World War. Drawing on New Deal funding, he oversaw the construction of a library and five dormitories and a wider refurbishment of the campus; the university doubled in physical plant, broadened its course offerings and gained new departments.

During the war the university trained civilian pilots and laboratory technicians, added science and engineering courses geared to defence work, and introduced what the South Carolina Encyclopedia describes as the first Red Cross nurse's aide course in the country.

McKissick also worked to change how the university was seen in the state, publicly rejecting what he called "unjustifiable criticism" and a long-running "whispering campaign" against it; the institution's standing with the public improved markedly during his tenure.

== Death and legacy ==
McKissick died suddenly of a heart attack in Columbia on September 3, 1944. Students and faculty petitioned the board of trustees to have him buried on campus, and he remains the only person granted that honour. After his body lay in state in the new library, he was buried on the Horseshoe in front of the South Caroliniana Library, which he had helped build up by giving it more than five thousand books, manuscripts and papers from his own collection.

Several months after his death the new university library was named for him; the building later housed the McKissick Museum.
