= Andrew Sorensen =

American academic

27th President of the University of South Carolina
- In office 2002–2008
- Preceded by: John M. Palms
- Succeeded by: Harris Pastides

25th President of the University of Alabama
- In office 1996–2002
- Preceded by: E. Roger Sayers
- Succeeded by: J. Barry Mason (interim)

Personal details
- Born: Andrew Aaron Sorensen; July 20, 1938 Pittsburgh, Pennsylvania, U.S.
- Died: April 17, 2011 (aged 72) Columbus, Ohio, U.S.
- Spouse: Donna Sorensen
- Children: 2
- Education: Yale University; University of Illinois; University of Michigan M.P.H.

Andrew A. Sorensen (July 20, 1938 – April 17, 2011) was an American academic administrator. He served as the president of the University of Alabama and the University of South Carolina. He later worked as senior vice president for development and special assistant to the president for advancement at Ohio State University.
