= John McLaren McBryde =

American academic

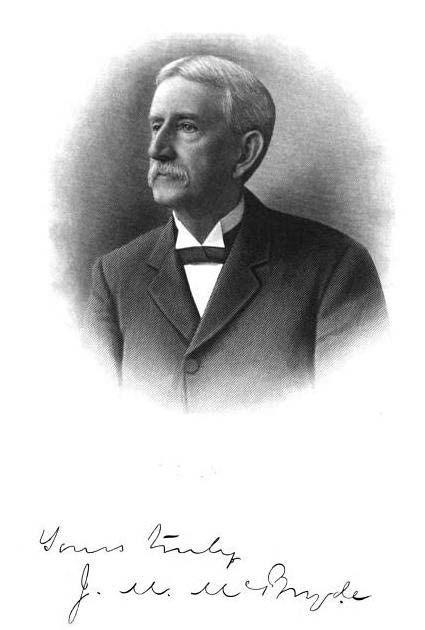

5th President of Virginia Agricultural and Mechanical College
- In office July 1, 1891 – September 1, 1907
- Preceded by: Lunsford L. Lomax
- Succeeded by: Paul Brandon Barringer

Personal details
- Born: January 1, 1841 Abbeville, South Carolina, U.S.
- Died: March 20, 1923 (aged 82) New Orleans, Louisiana, U.S.
- Education: University of Virginia

Military service
- Allegiance: Confederate States of America
- Branch/service: Confederate States Army

John McLaren McBryde (January 1, 1841 – March 20, 1923) was the fifth president of Virginia Tech, serving from July 1, 1891 to September 1, 1907. McBryde was born in Abbeville, South Carolina. He entered South Carolina College in 1858 at age 17 before going on to the University of Virginia. In 1861, he returned to Abbeville where he joined the Confederate Army. McBryde was present at the opening bombardment of Fort Sumter, South Carolina and fought in a Virginia cavalry unit. He later served as division chief of the Confederate War Tax Office in Richmond Virginia.

After the war until 1867, McBryde farmed in Buckingham County, Virginia until he moved to large farm near Charlottesville, Virginia. McBryde then went to teach at South Carolina College where he served as faculty chair and then as president from 1883 to 1891. McBryde also served as assistant Secretary of Agriculture under President Grover Cleveland.

During McBryde's 16-year tenure as President of Virginia Agriculture and Mechanical College, the college expanded greatly. McByrde expanded the curriculum to include seven bachelor's degrees in Agriculture, Horticulture, Applied Chemistry, General Science, Civil Engineering, Mechanical Engineering, and Electrical Engineering and founded a graduate department in 1891. The new curriculum no longer reflected the name of the college and in 1896 the Virginia General Assembly changed the college's name to Virginia Agricultural and Mechanical College and Polytechnic Institute, shortened in popular usage to Virginia Polytechnic Institute and then to VPI. The new name also brought new colors, which still stand as Chicago maroon and burnt orange, a school motto, Ut Prosim (That I May Serve), and a new college yell which prompted the nickname Hokies. During his tenure, V.P.I.'s first native-limestone-clad, neo-Gothic-style building, known as "The Chapel", was constructed on the site where Newman Library stands today. McByrde's legacy caused him to be known as the "Father of the Modern VPI". In the late 1800s McBryde persuaded the Board of Visitors to build the 15,147-square-foot Southern Colonial Revival mansion now known as "The Grove" to house the V.P.I. president, and became the first president to live in the house upon its completion in 1902. In 1907 upon retirement, McByrde was named first "President Emeritus" of Virginia Tech and also received Virginia Tech's first honorary degree (Doctor of Science). He died at age 82 on March 20, 1923, in New Orleans, Louisiana.

== Honors ==
McBryde Hall, a large classroom building on the Virginia Tech Campus is named for McBryde. The Modernist structure, replaced an earlier building known as McBryde Hall, built in 1917 in the Collegiate Gothic style to replace the Preston and Olin Building, then known as the VPI shop building, that had burned to the ground in 1914. Old McByrde hall was razed in the late 1960s and the current building was completed in 1972.
