= Robert L. Caslen =

University administrator

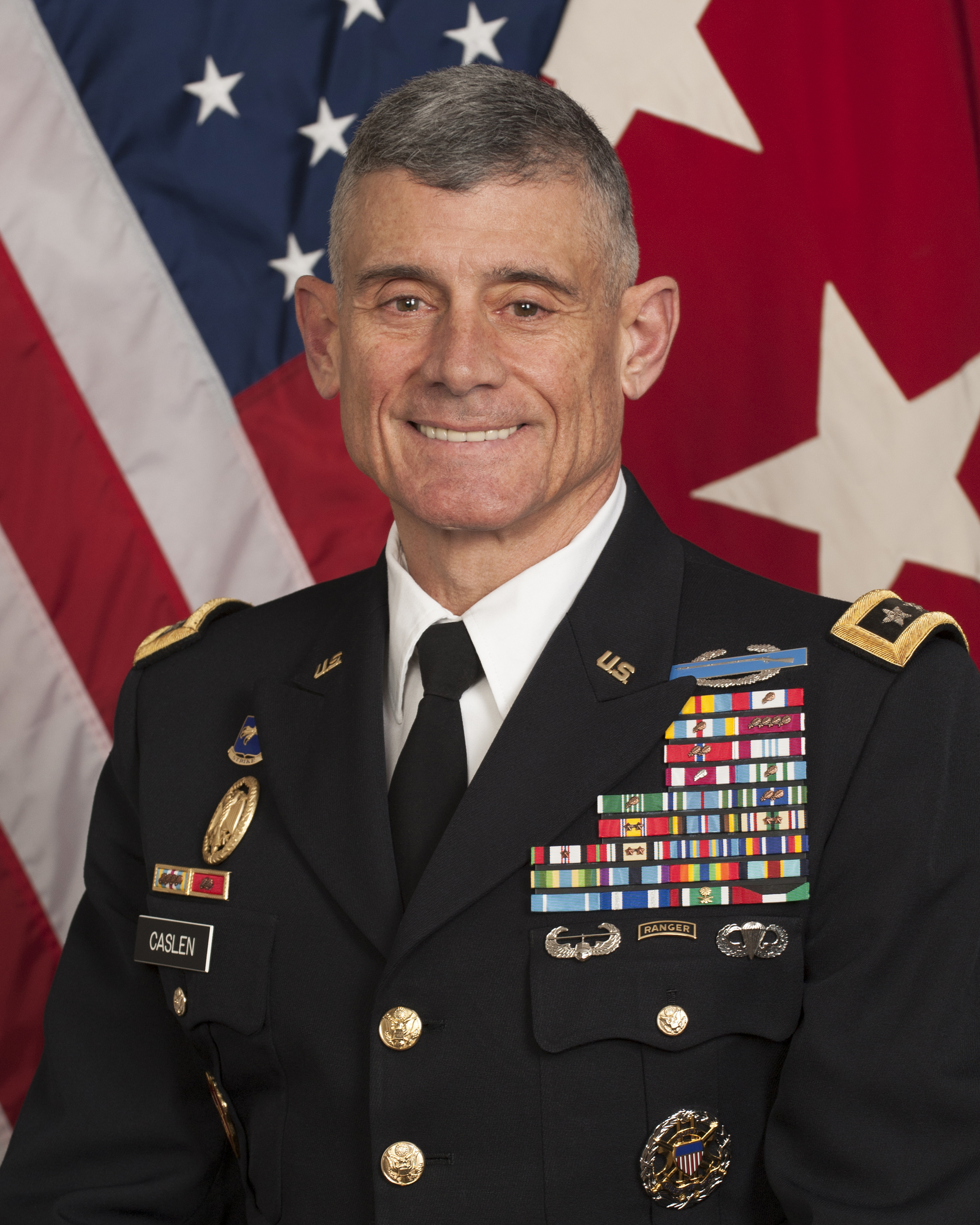
- Official portrait, 2017

29th President of the University of South Carolina
- In office 1 August 2019 – 13 May 2021
- Preceded by: Harris Pastides
- Succeeded by: Harris Pastides (interim)

59th Superintendent of the United States Military Academy
- In office 17 July 2013 – 22 June 2018
- President: Barack Obama; Donald Trump
- Preceded by: David H. Huntoon
- Succeeded by: Darryl A. Williams

Personal details
- Born: 30 November 1953 (age 72) Connecticut, United States
- Education: United States Military Academy (BS); Long Island University (MBA); Kansas State University (MS)
- Website: www.robertcaslen.com

Military service
- Allegiance: United States
- Branch/service: United States Army
- Years of service: 1975–2018
- Rank: Lieutenant General
- Commands: United States Military Academy (2013–2018); 25th Infantry Division (2008–2009)
- Battles/wars: Gulf War; Operation Uphold Democracy; War in Afghanistan; Iraq War
- Awards: Defense Distinguished Service Medal; Army Distinguished Service Medal (3); Defense Superior Service Medal (2); Legion of Merit (5); Bronze Star Medal (3)

Robert Louis Caslen Jr. (born 30 November 1953) is a retired United States Army lieutenant general who served as the 59th superintendent of West Point from 2013 until 2018 and as the 29th president of the University of South Carolina from July 2019 until May 2021. Between January and May 2019, Caslen was senior counsel to the president and interim chief financial officer at the University of Central Florida. On 19 July 2019, the board of trustees of the University of South Carolina elected him as the school's 29th president, a position he assumed on 1 August 2019. He resigned as president at South Carolina on 12 May 2021.

== Early life and education ==
Caslen was born in Connecticut, and grew up in Connecticut, Massachusetts, and Vermont.

In 1971, he graduated from North Country Union High School in Newport, Vermont. He graduated from the United States Military Academy at West Point in 1975, where he played center for the Army Black Knights football team. He also earned a Master of Business Administration from Long Island University. In 1989, he received a Master of Science degree in industrial engineering from Kansas State University. Caslen also received an honorary doctorate from Long Island University.

== Military career ==
During Operation Desert Storm, Caslen served as executive officer of the 2nd Battalion, 187th Infantry, 101st Airborne Division (Air Assault).

Caslen served as brigade operations officer, 3rd Brigade, 101st Airborne Division (Air Assault); J-3 in Honduras for Joint Task Force Bravo in 1998; executive officer to the deputy commander in Haiti during Operation Uphold Democracy in 1994–1995; commander of the 1st Battalion, 14th Infantry, 25th Infantry Division (Light); senior brigade C2 observer/controller, Operations Group, Joint Readiness Training Center; chief of staff of the 101st Airborne Division; and commander of the 2nd Brigade, 101st Airborne Division (1999).

Caslen was at the Pentagon during the September 11 attacks. Following the attack, he re-entered the Pentagon, helping search for wounded and working on reversing the air conditioning system in order to remove smoke from the building. Caslen was also chief of staff of the 10th Mountain Division (Light) (2003) at Fort Drum; assistant division commander (Maneuver) of the 3rd Infantry Division (Mechanized) (2004); deputy director for the War on Terrorism, J-5, the Joint Staff (2005 – June 2006); director of the Joint Staff's Detainee Affairs Division and commandant of cadets for the Military Academy at West Point, a post he left in May 2008. Caslen was chief of staff for the Combined Joint Task Force 180 in Afghanistan from May through September 2002. He was a commander of Operation Champion Sword.

According to a report by the Office of Inspector General, Caslen, fellow Army General Vincent K. Brooks, and Air Force generals Peter U. Sutton and Jack J. Catton Jr "violated the ethical guidelines of the military that forbid officers to promote private organizations" when they appeared in a video for an evangelical organization Christian Embassy. At the time, he was Commandant of Cadets at West Point. In a letter, he said he would be more vigilant about such improprieties going forward.

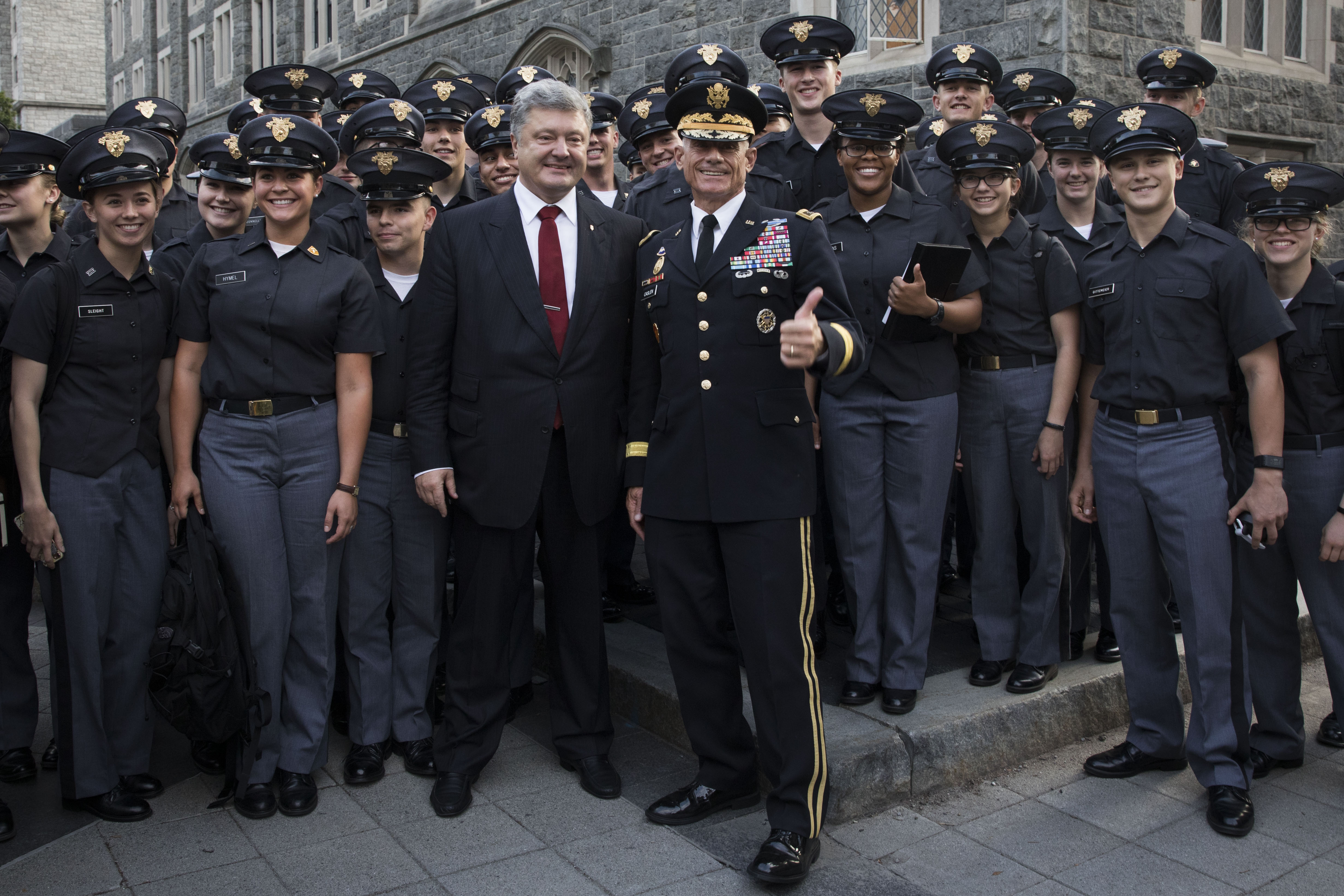
Caslen with Ukrainian President Petro Poroshenko and West Point cadets in September 2017

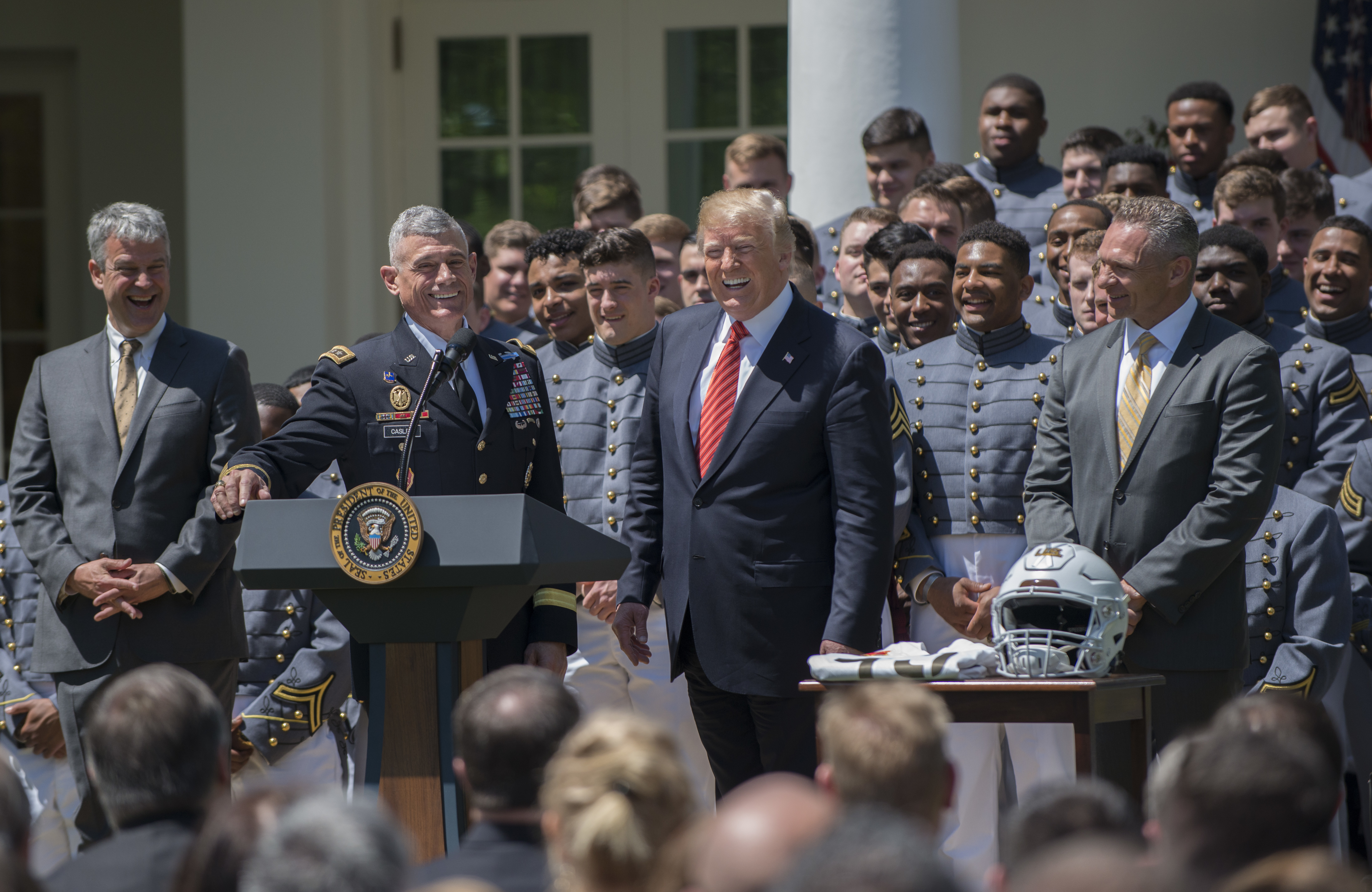
Caslen with President Donald Trump during a ceremony at the White House in May 2018

From May 2008 to December 2009, Caslen served as commander of the 25th Infantry Division. In October, he returned from a tour with the division in the Iraq War. Before this, he had served two tours in Afghanistan and one tour in the Gulf War. In December 2009, Caslen was nominated to be a lieutenant general in conjunction with his nomination to be Commandant of the United States Army Command and General Staff College at Fort Leavenworth which took effect in March 2010. In July 2011, Caslen was nominated to be chief of Office of Security Cooperation in Iraq.

Caslen was appointed as superintendent of the United States Military Academy on 17 July 2013. After five years of service, in April 2018 it was announced that Caslen would retire later in the year. In July, the army announced Lieutenant General Darryl A. Williams as Caslen's successor. The ceremonial relinquishing of command took place on 22 June 2018.

Over the course of his military career, Caslen received numerous civilian and military awards, including Defense Distinguished Service Medal, Army Distinguished Service Medal, Defense Superior Service Medal, Bronze Star Medal, German Armed Forces Badge for Military Proficiency, Defense Meritorious Service Medal, Global War on Terrorism Service Medal, Humanitarian Service Medal, Lifetime of Service Award from the American Red Cross, and NCAA Theodore Roosevelt Award, amongst others.

In February, 2017, it was reported that Caslen was being interviewed by President Donald Trump as a finalist for United States National Security Advisor after Trump requested the resignation of Michael T. Flynn after 24 days on the job.

Following his retirement from West Point, Caslen was in January 2019 appointed as chief accountability officer at the University of Central Florida to oversee the reformation of the finance and administration operations, a position from which he resigned in May.

== University of South Carolina presidency ==
On 19 July 2019, Caslen was selected as the 29th president of the University of South Carolina. He was initially among a group of four finalists for the position. While Caslen was reported to be the front-runner, there was significant controversy about his nomination, given that he does not possess an earned doctorate and because of comments made during open campus sessions regarding binge drinking and sexual assault; among faculty and students, 82% opposed Caslen's candidacy. It was later discovered by the Post and Courier that Mr. Caslen's name was added to the finalist list only after the intervention of the chairman of the board of trustees as Caslen was not originally a finalist or an agreed upon alternate nominated by the presidential search committee. On 26 April, the university Board of Trustees decided to reopen the search. Caslen sent a letter to the board withdrawing himself from consideration in the new search, stating, "“I am sorry that my record and my reputation had caused such a clamor at your university and were so polarizing to your faculty and student body . . . If I had known the environment of your campus, I would have withdrawn my nomination right away". However, it was revealed on 8 July, that South Carolina Governor Henry McMaster was urging members of the board to meet by the end of the week to vote on Caslen's candidacy for president. This caused more controversy, with the university's faculty senate unanimously passing motions to formally criticize the lack of transparency in the search process and to issue a vote of no confidence in Caslen to lead the university. Several alumni and donors also opposed the intervention of the governor in the presidential search; notably businesswoman Darla Moore, writing as "the largest donor to the university and the namesake of one of the largest schools", urged the board to abide by the 26 April decision to continue the search. and the SACS Commission on Colleges opening an inquiry into the search to determine if there was undue outside influence. One trustee, Egerton Burroughs, believed that the opposition to Caslen was entirely political, stating, without evidence, "A lot of the people that are demonstrating are from out of town. I heard some of that Kamala Harris crowd is there … got this thing all tied into the Democratic primary", though Burroughs was unaware his comments were being broadcast. Despite the opposition of faculty and students, on 19 July, Caslen was elected as the 29th president of the university by the board of trustees by a vote of 11–8, with one member voting "present".

Following his selection, Caslen stated that he recognized "the challenges the board addressed to get to this point" and expressed he would "listen to all of our students, faculty, staff, board members, and all our constituents". On 22 July 2019, Caslen held a press conference to announce his desire to raise the profile of the university by boosting the school's rankings, improving diversity, bolstering research, and beating in-state rival Clemson University in more athletic competitions. He also met with students, faculty, donors, and lawmakers, pledging to listen and learn. Caslen formally took office as the 29th president of the University of South Carolina on 1 August 2019. On 7 October, the SACS Commission on Colleges announced that it had opened an official inquiry into Mr. Caslen's selection as university president, SACS notified the university that there was "evidence of a significant accreditation-related issue" and opened a formal investigation into whether or not there was undue external influence on the search. Caslen acknowledged that the inquiry was legitimate and that trust between himself and the wider university community had been damaged. Though the SACS inquiry would result in no formal sanctions, the report did state that there was, indeed, undue political influence from the governor in the selection of Mr. Caslen; Governor McMaster's office denied the finding by arguing that the governor's influence is permissible as he is a member of the board of trustees ex officio. The university will be subject to enhanced monitoring, a compliance report, and a site visit in fall 2020.

In tandem with the SACS inquiry, the South Carolina Senate formed a bi-partisan committee to review the presidential search, looking into how to improve the process for future searches rather than remove Caslen as incumbent, but at least one member, Katrina Shealy, proposed to "listen to the issues" people had expressed with the search and then "move on" without any changes to improve the search process for the future.

Caslen co-authored The Character Edge: Leading and Winning with Integrity, with West Point Psychology Professor Dr. Michael Matthews.

At the 8 May 2021 commencement ceremony, Caslen mistakenly congratulated students for graduating from the "University of California". Later, he admitted that part of that same graduation speech was taken, without attribution, from the book Make Your Bed by William H. McRaven, which was based on a graduation speech given by McRaven at the University of Texas. Although he stated in an interview with local reporter, Judi Gatson that he had personally chosen the quote and “I completely didn’t think about attribution", Caslen gave the speech at least three times over the course of two days, using variations of the same McRaven quote, each time without attribution. On 11 May 2021, an article was published in WLTX news stating "Caslen offered to resign his job over two controversies involving last weekend's graduation but the chairman of the school's board of trustees rejected it. UofSC spokesman Jeff Stensland confirmed Caslen made the offer verbally but that Dorn Smith did not take it, meaning Caslen is still head of the school. On 12 May 2021, Caslen offered his resignation to the university's board of trustees, which was accepted. Former university president Harris Pastides was announced to be appointed as interim president.

== Personal life ==
Caslen is married to Michele (Shelly) Caslen (née Pastin) from Highland Falls, New York. They have three sons. Caslen lives in New Smyrna Beach, Florida.

Military offices
Preceded by William B. Caldwell IV	Commandant of the United States Army Command and General Staff College; 2010–2011	Succeeded by David G. Perkins
Preceded by David H. Huntoon	Superintendent of the United States Military Academy; 2013–2018	Succeeded by Darryl A. Williams
