= James B. Holderman =

American academic (1936–2021)

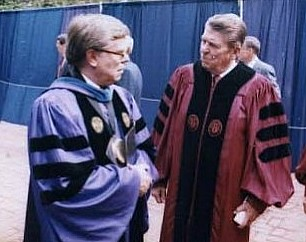
- Holderman (left) and President Reagan in September 1983

President of the University of South Carolina
- In office 1977–1990
- Preceded by: William H. Patterson
- Succeeded by: Arthur K. Smith (acting)

Personal details
- Born: January 29, 1936 Morris, Illinois
- Died: April 3, 2021 (aged 85)
- Education: Northwestern University

James Bowker Holderman (January 29, 1936 – April 3, 2021) was an American academic. He served as the president of the University of South Carolina from 1977 to his resignation in 1990. He was an alumnus of Northwestern University, where he earned his Ph.D. in 1962.

== Early life and education ==
Holderman was born on January 29, 1936, in Morris, Illinois. He served as the executive director of the Illinois Board of Higher Education, the vice president of the Lilly Foundation of Indiana, and the senior vice president of the Academy for Educational Development in Indianapolis.

== Presidency at the University of South Carolina (1977-1990) ==
Holderman was selected to be president of University of South Carolina on June 30, 1977. During Holderman's tenure, the university expanded its honors college, raised the academic standards for entering freshmen, and increased state funding. Holderman started the university's endowment program and promoted its international business programs.

Holderman is also credited with bringing Pope John Paul II, Ronald Reagan and George H. W. Bush to the university's campus.

On April 18, 1984, recently dismissed University of South Carolina professor Philip Zeltner shot and killed himself after holding a student hostage at gun point in Holderman's office.

In 1986, Holderman controversially paid Jehan Sadat a salary of $350,000 to teach for three semesters.

== Corruption charges and later life ==
In 1990, Holderman resigned from the university after it was revealed he had been misusing university funds. The next year, Holderman's wife requested a legal separation. He pleaded guilty in state court for using his office for personal gain and no contest to tax evasion. He received probation. In 1992, he was stripped of his tenure and his honorary title, President Emeritus, after the university's board of trustees investigated accusations of sexual assault made against him. Holderman was later convicted of bankruptcy fraud and sent to federal prison. Holderman was subsequently arrested in an FBI sting operation in 2003 for attempting to launder drug money and sell student visas. He was sentenced to 3 years in prison.
