= Thomas F. Jones =

American academic administrator (1916–1981)

Thomas Franklin Jones, Jr.

23rd President of the University of South Carolina
- In office 1962–1974
- Preceded by: Robert Llewellyn Sumwalt
- Succeeded by: William H. Patterson

Personal details
- Born: July 9, 1916 Henderson, Tennessee
- Died: July 14, 1981 Boston, Massachusetts
- Spouse: Mary Butterworth
- Children: 5
- Education: Mississippi State University (BS); Massachusetts Institute of Technology (Master of Science) (Doctor of Science)
- Occupation: Administrator, professor

Thomas Franklin Jones, Jr. (July 9, 1916 – July 14, 1981) was an academic and university administrator who served as the 23rd president of the University of South Carolina from 1962 until 1974, presiding over an era that included racial integration of the university, the Watergate scandal, the Vietnam War and other social changes.

== Early life and career ==
Jones was born July 9, 1916, in Henderson, Tennessee. He graduated from Mississippi State University and from Massachusetts Institute of Technology.

== President of the University of South Carolina ==
Jones was elected by the board of trustees to serve as president of the university in 1962, one year before the institution was formally integrated by three Black students, Henrie Monteith Treadwell (niece of Modjeska Monteith Simkins), Robert G. Anderson and James L. Solomon Jr. The decision to integrate was met with protests, but eventually was conducted without incident.

Jones is credited with expansion of the campus footprint, its graduate school programs and offerings.

== Death ==
Jones died on July 14, 1981.
