= Harris Pastides =

American academic

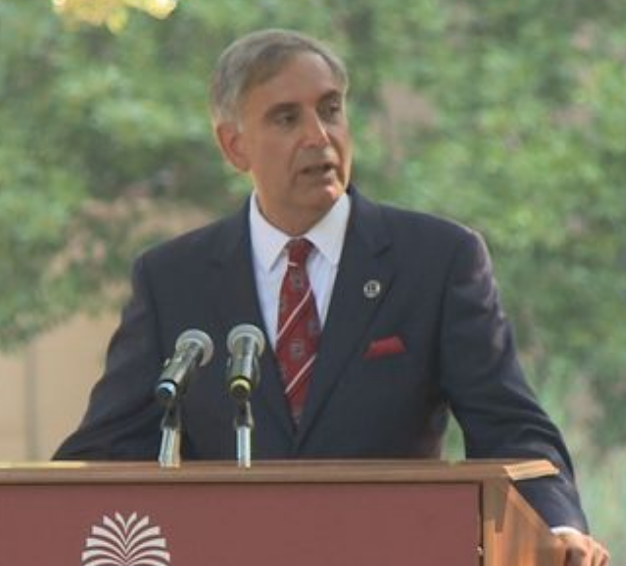

28th President of the University of South Carolina
- In office May 21, 2021 – July 1, 2022 (Note: Served as interim president)
- Preceded by: Robert L. Caslen
- Succeeded by: Michael Amiridis
- In office August 1, 2008 – July 31, 2019
- Preceded by: Andrew Sorensen
- Succeeded by: Robert L. Caslen

Personal details
- Born: February 21, 1954 (age 72) Queens, New York City, U.S.
- Spouse: Patricia Moore
- Children: 2
- Education: University at Albany (BS); Yale University (MPhil, MPH, PhD)
- Occupation: Administrator, Professor, Bank director

Harris Pastides (born 1954) is an academic and university administrator who served as the 28th president of the University of South Carolina from 2008 until 2019. In addition to his employment at the university Pastides has been on the board of directors of Synovus, a financial services company. On October 3, 2018, Pastides announced his intention to retire from the presidency of USC, the last day of which he served on July 31, 2019. He was again appointed Interim President at South Carolina after Bob Caslen resigned on May 13, 2021, officially taking office May 21, 2021 and serving until July 1, 2022.

== Early life and career ==
Pastides was born in the New York City borough of Queens to immigrants from Cyprus. He was the first person in his family to attend college when he enrolled in the University at Albany where he obtained his B.S. in Biology. He received his master's in public health and his M.Phil. and Ph.D. in epidemiology from Yale University.

He began his academic career at the University of Massachusetts Amherst, where during 1980–1998, he rose to become professor of epidemiology and chairman of the Department of Biostatistics and Epidemiology. In 2008, he was a finalist to become the university's Chancellor. His study on the health effects of chemicals used by the US semiconductor industry revealed links to an increase in miscarriages among employees. Although initially resisted, the study's findings were subsequently borne out, ironically leading to chipmaking's eventual outsourcing overseas.

== President of the University of South Carolina ==
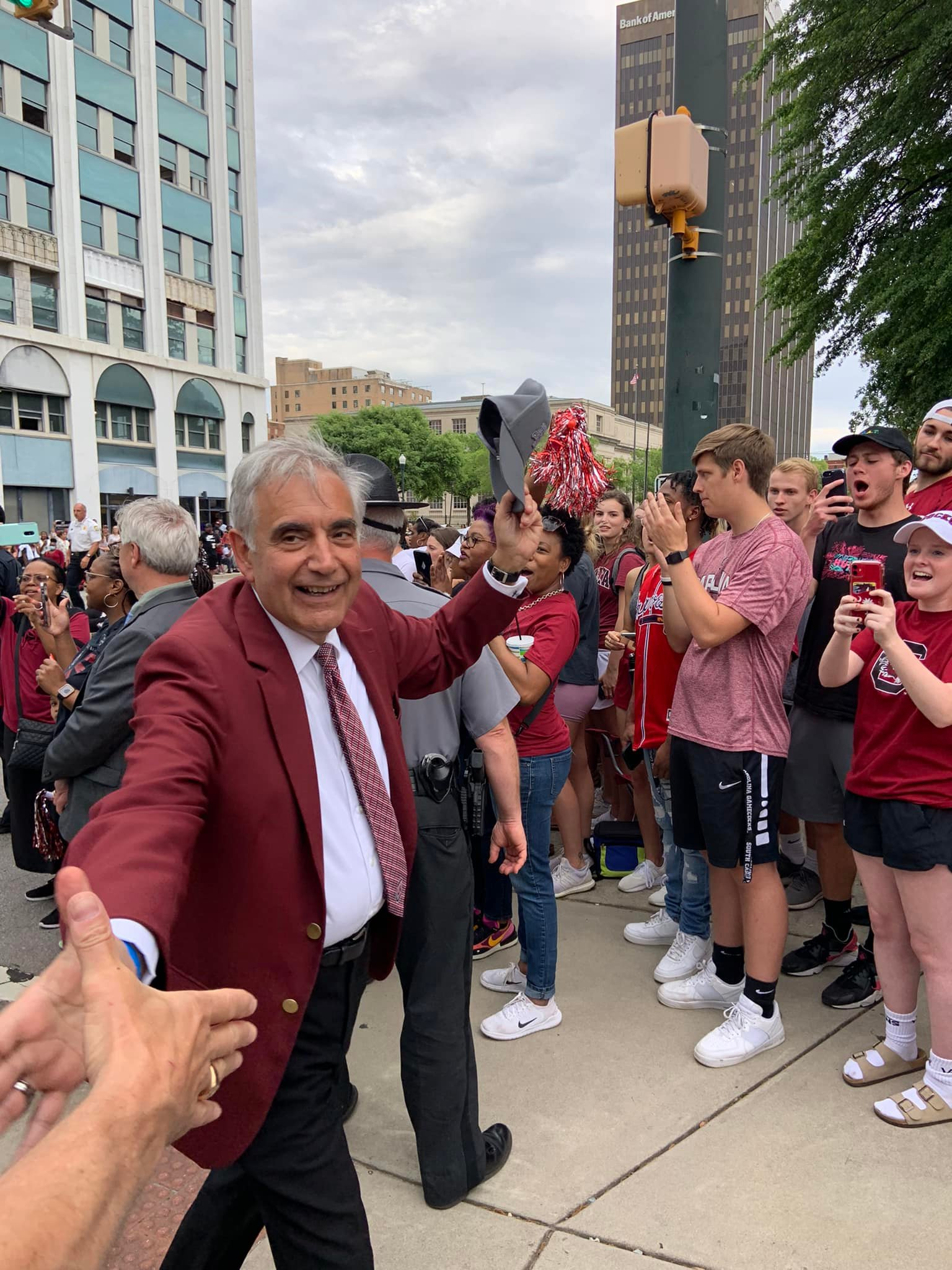
President Pastides at Women's Basketball national championship parade, 2022.

His election by the board of trustees marks the first internal candidate for the presidency of the university in more than a half century. Previously, Pastides served as vice president for research and health sciences and dean of the Arnold School of Public Health. He and his wife, Patricia, first came to the university in 1998.

During his tenure, Carolina's student population grew to record levels among the system's eight universities on 12 campuses. On the notion that degree attainment significantly affects the quality of life in South Carolina, Pastides lead nontraditional programs such as Palmetto College, Back to Carolina, Gamecock Gateway and Gamecock Guarantee to increase university access and affordability. In addition, he led a capital campaign to fund university priorities.

In addition to his position as President of the university, since 2014, Pastides has held a secondary employment in the private sector as part of the financial services industry. He has received $161,700 a year in stock and cash as a director at Synovus, a publicly traded financial services corporation specializing in commercial loans, mortgages, and retail banking.

The University of South Carolina's women's basketball team won two national championships during his presidency, once in 2017 and again in 2022.

Following the murder of Samantha Josephson, a university student who mistakenly entered the wrong car she believed to be her Uber and was killed, Pastides, along with Josephson's parents, popularized the phrase: "What's my name?" Pastides stated, "These three words have the power to save lives and must become as automatic to every college student getting into a ride-hailing vehicle as putting on a seatbelt." Pastides further advocated for further legislation to regulate the rideshare business, which was signed by Governor Henry McMaster as the Samantha L. Josephson Ridesharing Safety Act the following month.

On October 3, 2018, Pastides announced his plan to retire as president from the university. Shortly before, a report prepared by special prosecutor David Pascoe had revealed that several major South Carolina institutions, including the University of South Carolina, had used the Quinn firm to lobby the legislature while the firm was secretly paying S.C. lawmakers to influence legislation. Following a contentious search to hire a new USC President, former Superintendent of West Point Robert L. Caslen was eventually selected as Pastides' successor and took office on August 1, 2019.

=== Interim President ===
The Board of Trustees appointed Pastides as Interim President of the University of South Carolina after his successor, Bob Caslen, resigned on May 13, 2021. Pastides held the role from May 21, 2021 to July 1, 2022. He was succeeded by Michael Amiridis.
