= John Palms =

Dutch academic administrator (born 1935)

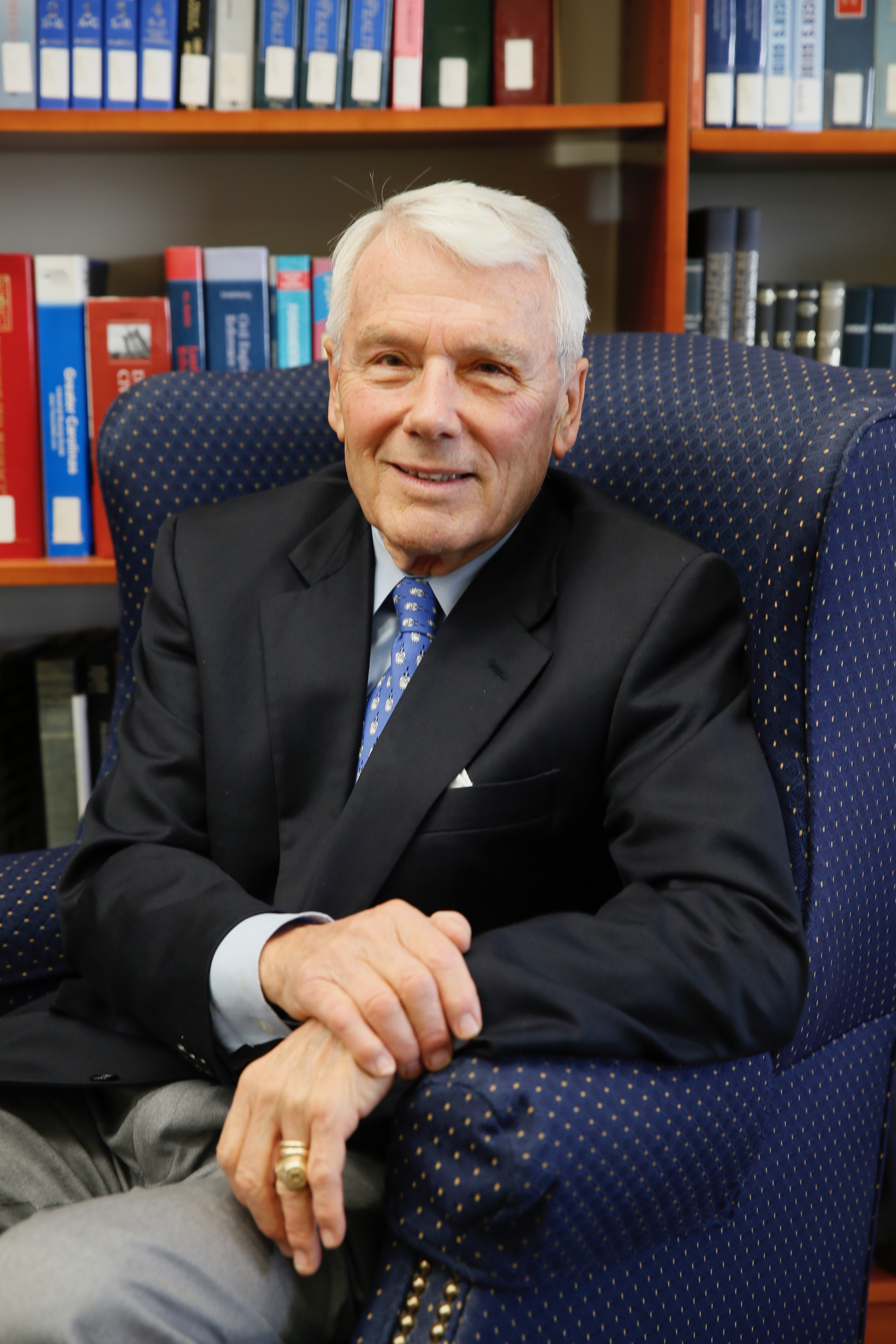

President of the University of South Carolina
- In office 1991–2002
- Preceded by: Arthur K. Smith (acting)
- Succeeded by: Andrew A. Sorenson

6th president of Georgia State University
- In office 1989–1991
- Preceded by: William M. Suttles
- Succeeded by: Sherman Day

Personal details
- Born: June 6, 1935 (age 91) Rijswijk, Netherlands
- Education: The Citadel; Emory University; University of New Mexico

John Michael Palms (born June 6, 1935, in Rijswijk, Netherlands) is an American military officer, nuclear physicist and college professor who also served as president of the University of South Carolina and Georgia State University.

== Early life and education ==
John Michael Palms was born on June 6, 1935, in Rijswijk, the Netherlands. His family moved to the United States during World War II, and permanently settled in 1951. Palms became a naturalized citizen in 1956. He attended The Citadel and graduated in 1958. Whilst in the United States Air Force, Palms earned a master's degree in physics from Emory University in 1959, and later a doctorate from the University of New Mexico.

== Career ==
Palms worked in the United States Air Force as a nuclear weapons officer. After leaving the service, he worked for over two decades at Emory University. He worked as president of Georgia State for two years, and then as president of the University of South Carolina for twelve years. He then became a distinguished professor at South Carolina for five years. After his retirement in 2007, the university made him a professor emeritus.

== Personal life ==
In 2012, Palms and his wife donated $1 million to the Department of Religious Studies at the University of South Carolina.
