= Presidents of the University of Alabama =

American university presidents

The president of The University of Alabama is the university's chief administrator, appointed by the board of trustees. The first to occupy the President's Mansion, on University Boulevard opposite the Quad, was Basil Manly, Sr., the university's second president.

== List of presidents ==
The University of Alabama has had 28 presidents appointed since its foundation, not including temporary acting and interim presidents.

- Alva Woods (1831–1837)
- Basil Manly, Sr. (1837–1855)
- Landon Garland (1854–1867)
- William Russell Smith (1869–1871)
- Matthew F. Maury (1871)
- Nathaniel Thomas Lupton (1871–1874)
- Carlos Green Smith (1874–1878)
- Josiah Gorgas (1878–1879)
- William Stokes Wyman (acting, 1879-1880 and 1885-1886) (1901–1902)
- Burwell Boykin Lewis (1880–1885)
- Henry DeLamar Clayton (1886–1889)
- Richard Channing Jones (1890–1897)
- James Knox Powers (1897–1901)
- John Abercrombie (1902-1911)
- George H. Denny (1912–1936, 1941–1942)
- Richard Clarke Foster (1937–1941)
- Raymond Ross Paty (1942–1947)
- Ralph E. Adams (acting, 1947–1948)
- John Gallalee (1948–1953)
- Lee Bidgood (acting, 1953)
- Oliver Carmichael (1953–1957)
- James H. Newman (acting, 1957-1958)
- Frank Rose (1958–1969)
- F. David Mathews (1969–1975, 1977–1980)
- Howard B. Gundy (acting, 1980-1981)
- Joab Thomas (1981–1988)
- E. Roger Sayers (1988–1996)
- Andrew Sorensen (1996–2002)
- J. Barry Mason (interim, 2002-2003)
- Robert Witt (2003–2012)
- Guy Bailey (2012)
- Judy L. Bonner (2012–2015)
- Stuart Bell (2015–2025)
- Peter J. Mohler (2025-present)
