= John Gallalee =

American academic administrator (1883–1961)

John Morin Gallalee (1883–1961) was an American engineer, who became President of the University of Alabama.

Gallalee was raised in Portsmouth, Virginia, and earned a master's degree in engineering from the University of Virginia. He began teaching at the University of Alabama in 1913, and later oversaw campus construction. Gallalee's tenure as university president began in 1948. During his time in office, UA added nine residence halls, two classroom buildings and a stadium expansion to its campus, as well as the Capstone College of Nursing. Gallalee was succeeded by interim president Lee Bidgood in 1953, and continued working as a consultant engineer. He died on December 4, 1961, aged 78.
