= Nathaniel Thomas Lupton =

American chemist

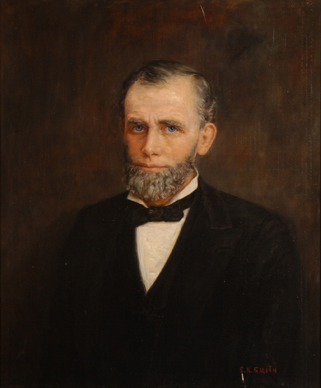
- Born: December 30, 1830; Winchester, Virginia, US
- Died: June 11, 1893 (aged 62); Auburn, Alabama, US
- Education: Newark Academy; Dickinson College
- Occupations: Chemist, university professor
- Spouse: Ella Virginia Allemong
- Children: 3

Nathaniel Thomas Lupton (December 30, 1830 – June 11, 1893) was an American chemist and university professor. He served as the President of the University of Alabama from 1871 to 1874. Additionally, he served as State Chemist of Alabama.

== Early life ==
Nathaniel Thomas Lupton was born on December 30, 1830, near Winchester, Virginia. His father was Nathaniel Lupton and his mother, Elizabeth Hodgson. He was raised as a Methodist, and would remain a devout Methodist all his life. He was educated at the defunct Newark Academy in Delaware. He attended Dickinson College in Carlisle, Pennsylvania from 1846 to 1849, where he was a member of the Belles Lettres Society. He graduated in 1849, planning to study the Law.

== Career ==
He started his career teaching chemistry at Aberdeen Female College, a Methodist women's school in Aberdeen, Mississippi. In 1852, he moved to Petersburg, Virginia, where he taught chemistry in another Methodist school. From 1854 to 1856, he served as president of Petersburg College, even though he was only twenty-four years old. In 1856, he became a professor of chemistry at Randolph-Macon College in Ashland, Virginia. He went traveling in Europe and took lessons from renowned German chemist Robert Bunsen (1811–1899) at the Heidelberg University in Heidelberg, Germany. Back in the US, he taught chemistry at Southern University in Greensboro, Alabama (now known as Birmingham–Southern College and located in Birmingham, Alabama).

During the American Civil War of 1861–1865, he ran the Confederate Nitre and Mining Bureau in Selma, Alabama, which supplied powder and artillery ordnance to the Confederate States Army. Politically, he was a Democrat.

In 1869, he was hired by the Smithsonian Institution to explore the Moundville Archaeological Site in Moundville, Alabama. He returned to academia to serve as the sixth president of the University of Alabama in Tuscaloosa, Alabama from 1871 to 1874. He helped in its reconstruction, as the university had been heavily damaged by Northern troops, but struggled to find sufficient funding. In 1874, he moved to Nashville, Tennessee, where he worked as a professor of chemistry at Vanderbilt University and later as Head of Pharmacy until 1885. During that time, he also took trips to Europe to stock the chemistry laboratories at Vanderbilt. Finally, he moved to the new Alabama Polytechnic Institute (now known as Auburn University) in Auburn, Alabama, where he taught chemistry and started the Nathaniel T. Lupton Conversation Club "for social and intellectual improvement." He also served as State Chemist of Alabama.

During his summers, he explored the West and became involved in the mining industry in Mexico. He was also interested in Native American culture.

== Personal life ==
Lupton married Ella Virginia Allemong. They had three children. Their daughter Kate was the first female to graduate from Vanderbilt University in 1879, even though she received her diploma in a private ceremony. She married Levi Washington Wilkinson, a professor of chemistry at Tulane University, and they had a son, Lupton Allemong Wilkinson, who became an essayist and poet.

== Death ==
Lupton died on June 11, 1893, in Auburn, Alabama.

== Bibliography ==
- The Elementary Principles of Scientific Agriculture (New York: D. Appleton and Company, 1880).
- Commercial Fertilizers (1889).
- Nitrogen as a Fertilizer (1890).
- Effects on Butter by Feeding Cotton Seed and Cotton Seed Meal (1891).
- Effect of Decomposing Organic Matter on Natural Phosphates (1892).
- The Effect of Organic Matter on Natural Phosphates: Commercial Fertilizers (1893).
