= John Nelson Arnold =

American painter

- Born: June 4, 1834; Masonville, Windham County, Connecticut, US
- Died: May 31, 1909 (aged 74); Providence, Rhode Island, US
- Occupation: Portrait painter
- Notable work: Art and Artists in Rhode Island (1905)

John Nelson Arnold (June 4, 1834 – May 31, 1909) was an American portrait painter.

He was born on June 4, 1834, in Masonville, Windham County, Connecticut. He was the son of Benjamin Arnold and Thirza Whitford, and was descended from Roger Williams.

His portraits of governors are located in the Rhode Island State House and other portraits are in the Brown University Portrait Collection. Arnold painted portraits of John Russell Bartlett, John Brown Francis, Reuben Guild, John Hay, John Pitman, Barnas Sears, Leonard Swain, James Mitchell Varnum, Sarah Helen Whitman, and Alva Woods, among others.

He published Art and Artists in Rhode Island in 1905. Arnold was also a member of the Providence Art Club from its founding in 1880 to his death in 1909.

He married his student, Clara L. Maxfield in 1908. At the time, he was 73 and she was 27. He died on May 31, 1909.
