= Alva Woods =

American minister (1794–1887)

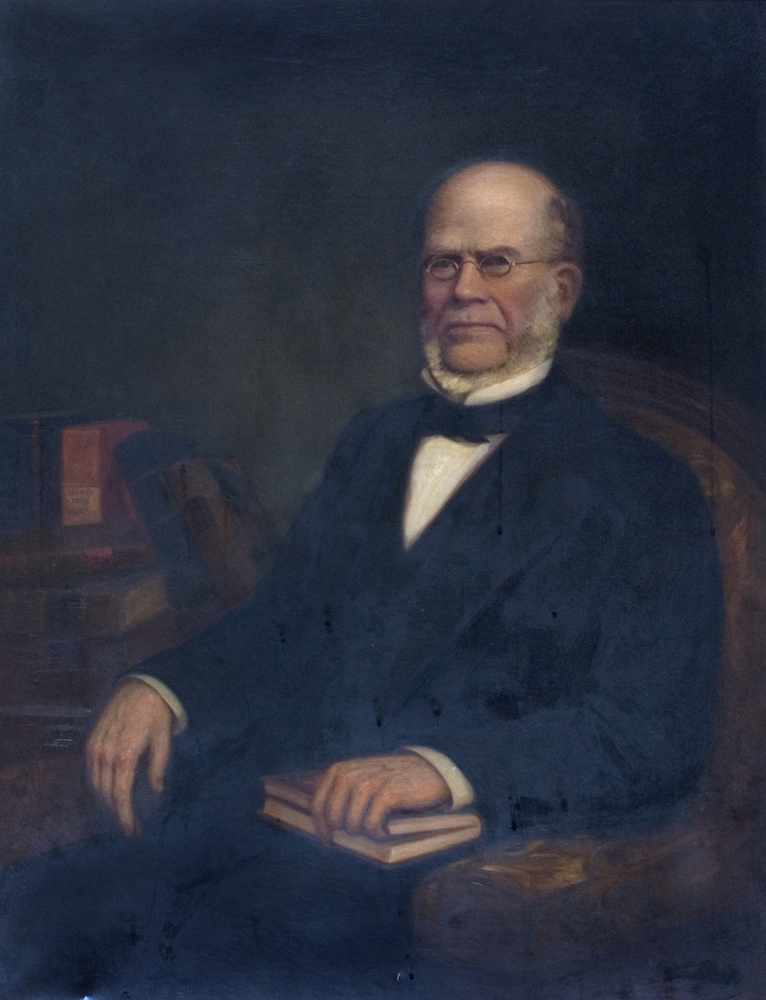
- Alva Woods, painted by John Nelson Arnold
- Born: August 13, 1794; Shoreham, Vermont
- Died: September 6, 1887 (aged 93); Providence, Rhode Island
- Education: Phillips Academy; Harvard College; Andover Theological Seminary
- Alma mater: Harvard University
- Occupations: Baptist minister; University professor and president: (Brown University, 1826-28; Transylvania University, 1828-31; University of Alabama, 1831-37)

Alva Woods (1794–1887) was an American minister, university professor and university president. He was interim President of Brown University, 1826–28 and President of Transylvania University, 1828-31. Of most historical significance, he served as the first President of the University of Alabama from 1831 to 1837.

== Biography ==
=== Early life ===
Alva Woods was born on August 13, 1794, in Shoreham, Vermont. He was raised as a Baptist. He studied at Phillips Academy in Andover, Massachusetts, graduating in 1813. He graduated from Harvard in 1817 and entered the Andover Theological Seminary, from which he graduated in September 1821. He was ordained in October 1821.

=== Career ===
Woods became a professor at the new Columbian College in Washington, D.C. In 1824, he became professor of mathematics and natural philosophy at Brown, where he was interim President (1826–27). In 1828 he became president of Transylvania University.

In 1831 Woods accepted the presidency of the University of Alabama. He resigned from the University of Alabama in 1837, becoming a prison minister. He died in Providence, Rhode Island, on September 6, 1887.
