= George H. Denny =

American academic (1870–1955)

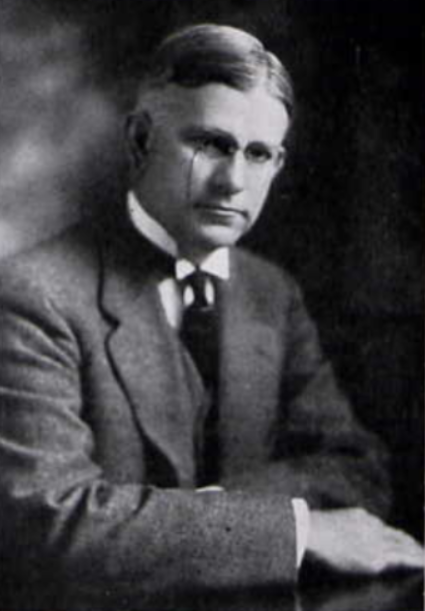

15th President of the University of Alabama
- In office 1912–1936

President of Washington & Lee University
- In office 1901–1912

Personal details
- Born: December 3, 1870 Hanover County, Virginia, U.S.
- Died: April 2, 1955 (aged 84)
- Education: Hampden-Sydney College (BA); University of Virginia (PhD)
- Occupation: College administrator, professor, football coach

George Hutcheson Denny (December 3, 1870 – April 2, 1955) was an American academic and former president at both Washington and Lee University and the University of Alabama. Both a football coach and an educator, he ultimately was appointed Washington and Lee's president in 1901, and served in that position until his resignation in 1912 to become president at Alabama. Denny served as president of Alabama from 1912 through 1936 and again as interim president in 1941 and 1942. Denny oversaw a major expansion of both enrollment and the physical campus during his tenure. He died at age 84 on April 2, 1955, in Lexington, Virginia.

== Early life and education ==
Denny was born on December 3, 1870, in Hanover County, Virginia, to George H. and Charlotte M. Denny. He attended Hampden–Sydney College, where he earned his Bachelor of Arts in 1891 and his Master of Arts in 1892. In 1896 Denny was awarded his Doctor of Philosophy from the University of Virginia. During his education at University of Virginia, he became a member of the Sigma Chi fraternity.

== Career ==
=== Hampden–Sydney College ===
After obtaining his doctorate, Denny returned to Hampden–Sydney, where he was a professor of Latin and German from 1896 though 1899. He resigned to become a professor of Latin at Washington and Lee University.

During his teaching tenure at Hampden–Sydney, Denny served as the head coach of their football team for the 1896 season. For the season, he led the Tigers to home victories over Randolph–Macon and Roanoke and a loss on the road against VPI en route to a record of two wins and one loss (2–1).

=== Washington and Lee University ===
Denny started his career at Washington and Lee University in 1899 and by 1900 he was appointed as the interim president of the school. In October 1901 the university trustees appointed him as the full-time president of the university. During his tenure as president, Denny oversaw increased enrollment at Washington and Lee, improved facilities and overall finances. He remained in the position of president through the fall of 1911 when he resigned in order to become the 15th president of the University of Alabama.

=== University of Alabama ===
The note educator and administrator started his tenure at the University of Alabama in January 1912. During his period in office as university president, Denny oversaw a significant increase in enrollment and construction on-campus. Both Denny Chimes and Bryant–Denny Stadium were named in his honor. He retired as president in 1936, but was later reappointed as interim president from 1941 to 1942.

== Later life ==
After he completed his term as interim president, Denny retired to Lexington, Virginia, in 1943. Denny died on April 2, 1955, at a hospital in Lexington as a result of complications suffered after the amputation of his left leg.

== Head coaching record ==
=== Football ===
Year	Team	Overall	Conference	Standing	Bowl/playoffs
Hampden–Sydney Tigers (Independent) (1896–present)
1896	Hampden–Sydney	2–1			
Hampden–Sydney:		2–1			
Total:		2–1			

Academic offices
Preceded by Henry St. George Tucker	President of Washington and Lee University; 1901–1911	Succeeded by Henry Donald Campbell and John Lyle Campbell
Preceded by John Abercrombie	President of the University of Alabama; 1912–1936	Succeeded by Richard Clarke Foster
Preceded by Richard Clarke Foster	President of the University of Alabama; 1941–1942	Succeeded by Raymon Ross Paty
