= Oozeball =

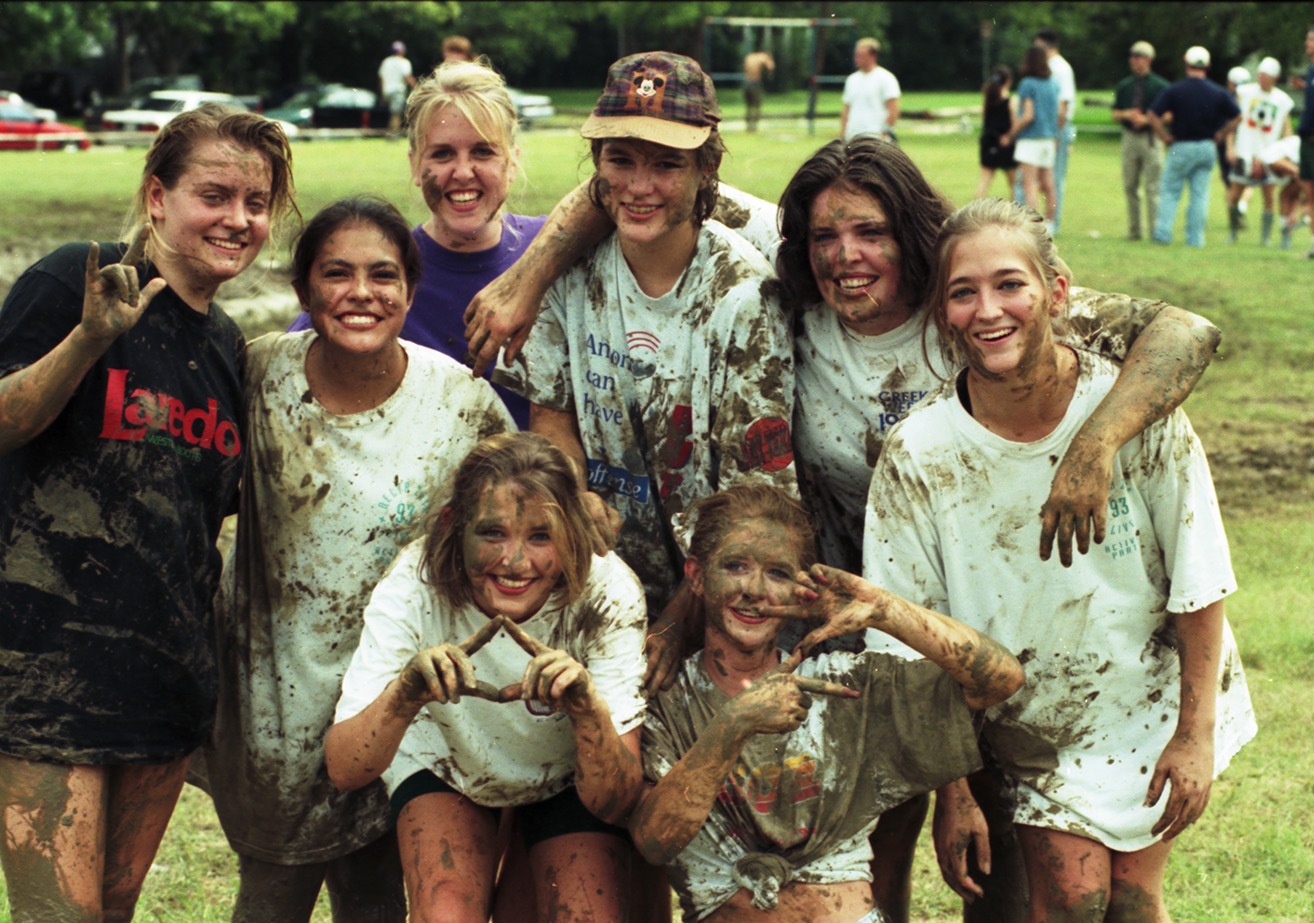
Oozeball at the University of Texas at Arlington, 1997

Oozeball (also OOzeball) is a volleyball tournament at several American universities, played in 8 inches of mud and often staged as a fundraising event. The game was being played at the University of Missouri by at least 1980, but where it originated is unknown.

== University of Connecticut ==
An annual Oozeball event is organized by the University of Connecticut's Student Alumni Association during Spring Weekend, which is traditionally the weekend before the last week of class. Each year over 1,000 players and spectators attend the tournament. The 2010 event marked the 27th "UConn OOzeball" event, making it the longest running tournament of its kind in the nation.

UConn OOzeball has been recognized three times by Sports Illustrated:

- "Best Mud Volleyball in the Country" – SI Best of College Sports
- 33 on the "Top 100 Things Gotta Do Before You Graduate: No Matter The Cost" – SI On Campus
- "Best Use of Dirt" – SI On Campus

In 2011, in an effort to curb the Spring Weekend partying and violence, the University declared that all University-sanctioned events were to be held the weekend before the traditional date. Officially, this was in part due to a late Easter falling during the "real" Spring Weekend. However, temperatures in the upper 30s forced the event to be cancelled early, with at least nine students experiencing hypothermia. The student body was displeased with the new date, and in subsequent years, the tournament was moved back to Spring Weekend.

== University of Texas Arlington ==
Since 1989, students, faculty, staff, and alumni at University of Texas at Arlington have competed annually in an oozeball competition, with proceeds helping to fund student scholarships.
