= Ernest H. Hereford =

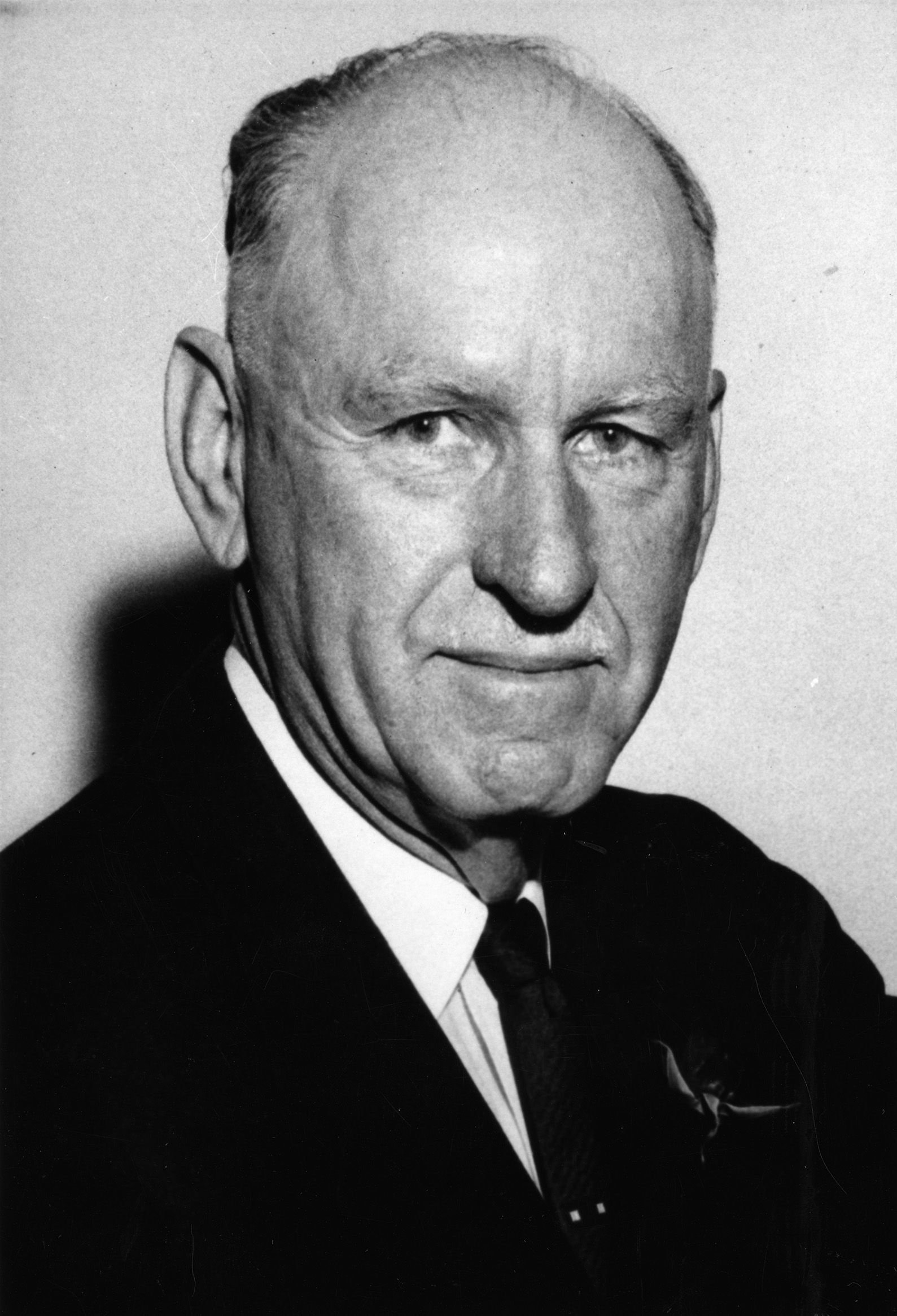
- Born: 21 December 1894; Llano, Texas, US
- Died: 24 November 1958; Arlington, Texas, US
- Education: North Texas State Teachers College; Baylor University; Southwestern University; University of Texas
- Known for: Dean, North Texas Agricultural College President, Arlington State College
- Honors: E. H. Hereford Statue E.H. Hereford University Center

Ernest 'H' Hereford (December 21, 1894 – November 24, 1958) was Dean of North Texas Agricultural College from 1946–49, when the school was renamed Arlington State College he served as President from 1949 until his death in 1958. The college would later become the University of Texas at Arlington in 1965. His tenure included the expansion of the school system, the changing nature of the school away from primarily-agricultural studies, Cold War-era "Citizenship classes" being promoted via the state government, as well as the spearheading the change of the school theme from 'Blue Riders' to the 'Rebels' in 1951.

== Early life ==
Hereford was born in 1894 in Burnet, Texas. After graduating from Robert E. Lee High School in Burnet, Texas, he went to Southwestern University. From 1916 to 1921 he was a ward school principal and athletic coach in the Llano Public School. From 1921 until 1932 he was a college professor at Southwestern University and the University of Texas in Austin. From 1932 to 1938 he was the superintendent of schools, and President of the Municipal Junior College at Corpus Christi. Hereford also established the Corpus Christi Junior College in 1935. From 1938 to 1941 he was the State College Examiner and Curriculum Director for the State Department of Education in Austin, Texas. In 1941 he became the Dean of the Staff and Director of Public Relations at the Hockaday School of Dallas.

Since 1942, Hereford has been associated with attached to the-then North Texas Agricultural College. First brought on as Registrar, then promoted by then-Dean E. E. Davis as Associate Dean in 1943, and finally promoted to Dean in 1946 as Davis retired. In 1949, the college was transformed into the Arlington State College, or ASC, and E. H. Hereford became its first President in the newly reorganized Texas A&M system.

== The Rebel Theme ==
In the summer of 1951, Hereford set up a committee comprising Colonel Edgar H. Keltner, Miss Melba Hammack, Colonel Earl D. Irons, Cothburn M. O’Neal and several students to discuss changes to the theme and mascot of the school. Hereford felt that the students did not really appreciate the then-current 'Blue Riders' as a team or a theme of the school. Two candidates were to be presented to the student body at the first fall weekly assembly in 1951 - the 'Cadets', and the 'Rebels'. Regardless of the choice, a song was already written by Colonel Earl D. Irons and Cothburn O’Neal named 'Fight on, Rebels!' or 'Fight on, Cadets!' depending on the choice of the students.

On September 18, 1951, the fall assembly chose the 'Rebels' as their mascot as a unanimous decision. Hereford stressed, as President, that the student body would need to be content with their decision and fully adopt 'Johnny Rebel' as their school mascot - and personally remarking that he "did not much care for the Blue Riders, anyway". In the following week the school set up a 'Draw Johnny Rebel' contest that would last from September 25 until September 27, as a school document stressed that ASC students must have the Rebel “become a living symbol and part of our tradition...the ASC REBEL must become a reality – one that all will recognize.”

Hereford adopted the "Rebel Flag" as the symbol of ASC in 1952

This Johnny Reb mascot would fully feature in a Shorthorn September 23 cartoon that showed the mascot and a Robert E. Lee caricature carrying the Confederate Beauregard Battle Flag stirring the new-ASC ‘Rebs’ in a football game.

As 1951 went on, the “Fight on, Rebels!” song was dropped by the band during football games, and "Dixie's Land" would be the new school fight song, and by 1954 it was accepted as the official fight song. In November 1951, Hereford personally appointed a committee, with C. M. O’Neal as its chair, to begin the adoption of Rebels iconography, the creation of Rebel and Belle organizations, and the dressing of these organizations in self-described 'antebellum' uniforms. The Shorthorn reported on November 17, 1951, that the first Homecoming in several years would feature a “Rebel float”, sporting the Beauregard Battle Flag as its main insignia.

In 1952, Hereford had the Beauregard Battle Flag made the official school symbol. The flag would also, in military parades henceforth, be flown alongside the United States flag, as well as the A&M system flag in any gatherings like Homecoming or football games.

== Death ==
Hereford suffered a heart attack on July 22, 1958, which forced him to step down from office throughout the summer. He returned to the presidency in the fall, although a second heart attack led to his death on November 24, 1958. The Texas A&M System named then-Dean Jack Woolf of ASC acting President on December 2, 1958, until he was confirmed President in summer 1959. The Reveille Annual for 1959 dedicated a page eulogizing Hereford, and in 1960 dedicated a page to the ‘E. H. Hereford Memorial’ – now known as the E. H. Hereford Statue, which resides in the E. H. Hereford University Center. The statue, sculpted by alumnus Edward C. Brown, was planned as early as October 21, 1958, by a committee consisting of E. C. Barksdale, Miss Woulida Piner, Colonel Kirk P. Brock, Lloyd Lasen, and Cothburn O’Neal. The University Center, then the ‘Student Union building’, was named via a decision from the board of regions of the A&M System on February 28, 1959.

On November 23, 1959. M. T. Harrington, then Chancellor of the A&M System, presented the plaque and statue during the naming ceremony for the Center on behalf of the faculty and staff in order to preserve the legacy of President Hereford.

== Legacy ==
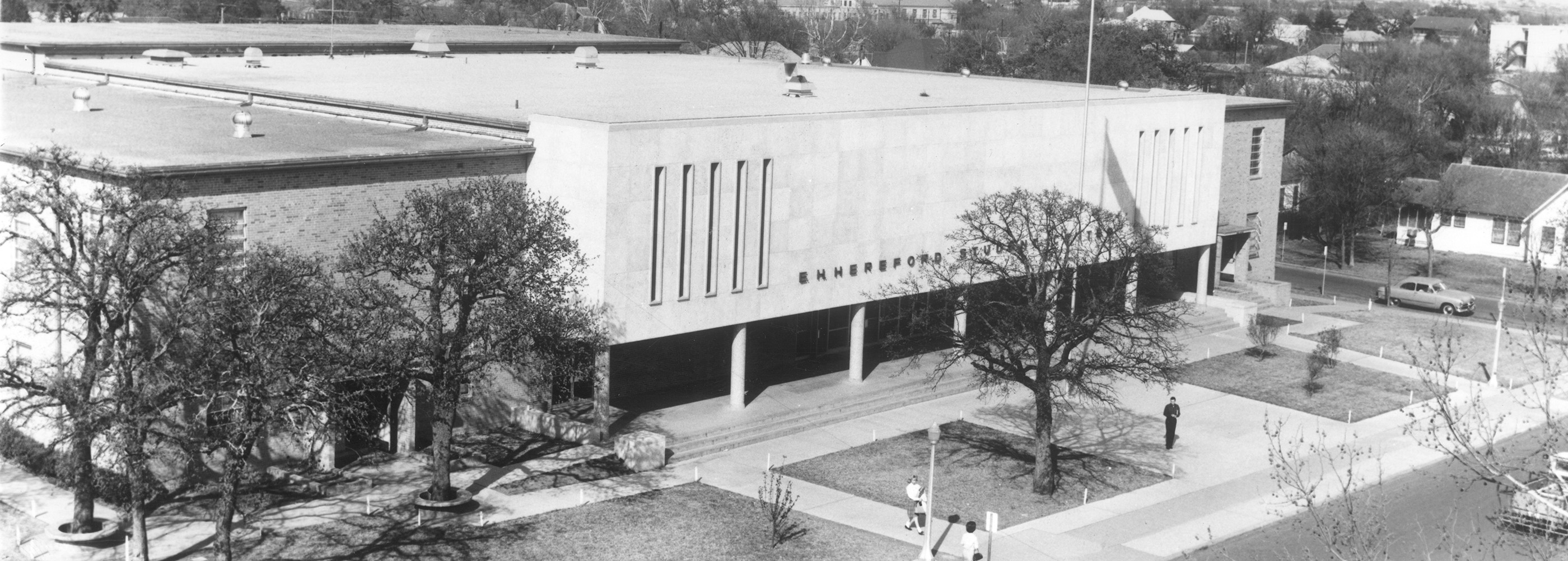
E.H. Hereford University Center on the UTA campus, named in honor of Hereford

Hereford served as President during the changing nature of the school from a predominant agricultural college, North Texas Agricultural College, to a preeminent junior college, Arlington State College. Through his efforts and pushes for legislation ASC would become a four-year institution, although this was six months after his death.

He, likewise, was paramount in the changing atmosphere on campus: he spearheaded the adoption of Confederate iconography for the school. As early as October 1951, students could be seen waving the Beauregard Battle Flag of the Confederacy. His leadership saw the development of Confederacy-related traditions and icons of ASC: the “ASC Rebs”, “Miss Dixie Bell”, the Confederate Battle Flag as the school symbol, Confederate symbols on all uniforms, celebration of Edward Emmet Rankin's part of Nathan Forrest's Raiders in the Civil War and founder of what would become NTAC-ASC, “Old South Week” (including mock-slave auctions) Likewise, his administration would see the use of minstrel shows as part of school-sponsored events, and a campus organization that used 'KKK' as its official acronym.

E. H. Hereford was integral in the changes at NTAC-ASC, starting with the adoption of “President ” as opposed to “Dean” for the top-head administrator of the institution.

== Personal life ==
Hereford married his wife in 1916. His wife, Ida Ruth Barnett, was from Llano, Texas. They had two children, Carl Finley Hereford and Nettie Ruth Hereford. His wife died on June 8, 1992, in Austin, Texas and is entombed next to her husband in the Llano City Cemetery.
