= University of Texas at Arlington =

Public research university in Arlington, Texas, US

The University of Texas at Arlington
- Former names: Arlington College (1895–1902); Carlisle Military Academy (1901–1913); Arlington Training School (1913–1916); Arlington Military Academy (1916–1917); Grubbs Vocational College (1917–1923); North Texas Agricultural College (1923–1949); Arlington State College (1949–1967)
- Motto: Disciplina Praesidium Civitatis (Latin)
- Motto in English: "The cultivated mind is the guardian genius of democracy"
- Type: Public research university
- Established: 1895; 131 years ago
- Parent institution: University of Texas System
- Accreditation: SACS
- Academic affiliations: URA; ORAU; Space-grant
- Endowment: $223.2 million (FY2024) (UTA only) $47.47 billion (FY2024) (system-wide)
- Budget: $928.7 million (FY2025)
- President: Archie Holmes, Ph.D., acting president, 2026-present
- Faculty: 1,831 (fall 2023)
- Administrative staff: 603 (fall 2024)
- Total staff: 6,345 (fall 2024)
- Students: 41,613 (fall 2024)
- Undergraduates: 29,271 (fall 2024)
- Postgraduates: 12,342 (fall 2024)
- Location: Arlington, Texas, United States; 32.7307°N 97.1146°W
- Campus: 420 acres (1.7 km^{2}); Large City
- Newspaper: The Shorthorn
- Colors: Royal blue, orange, and white
- Nickname: Mavericks
- Sporting affiliations: NCAA Division I – WAC
- Mascot: Blaze
- Website: www.uta.edu

The University of Texas at Arlington (UTA or UT Arlington) is a public research university in Arlington, Texas, United States. It is the second-oldest university in the University of Texas System and was founded in 1895. It was in the Texas A&M University System for several decades until joining the University of Texas System in 1965.

The university is classified among "R1: Doctoral Universities – Very high research activity". The fall 2024 campus enrollment consisted of 41,613 students making it the second-largest university in the UT System after UT Austin, in North Texas and fifth-largest in Texas. UT Arlington is the third-largest producer of college graduates in Texas and offers over 180 baccalaureate, masters, and doctoral degree programs.

UT Arlington participates in 15 intercollegiate sports as a Division I member of the NCAA and Western Athletic Conference. UTA sports teams have been known as the Mavericks since 1971.

== History ==
=== Establishment (1895–1916) ===
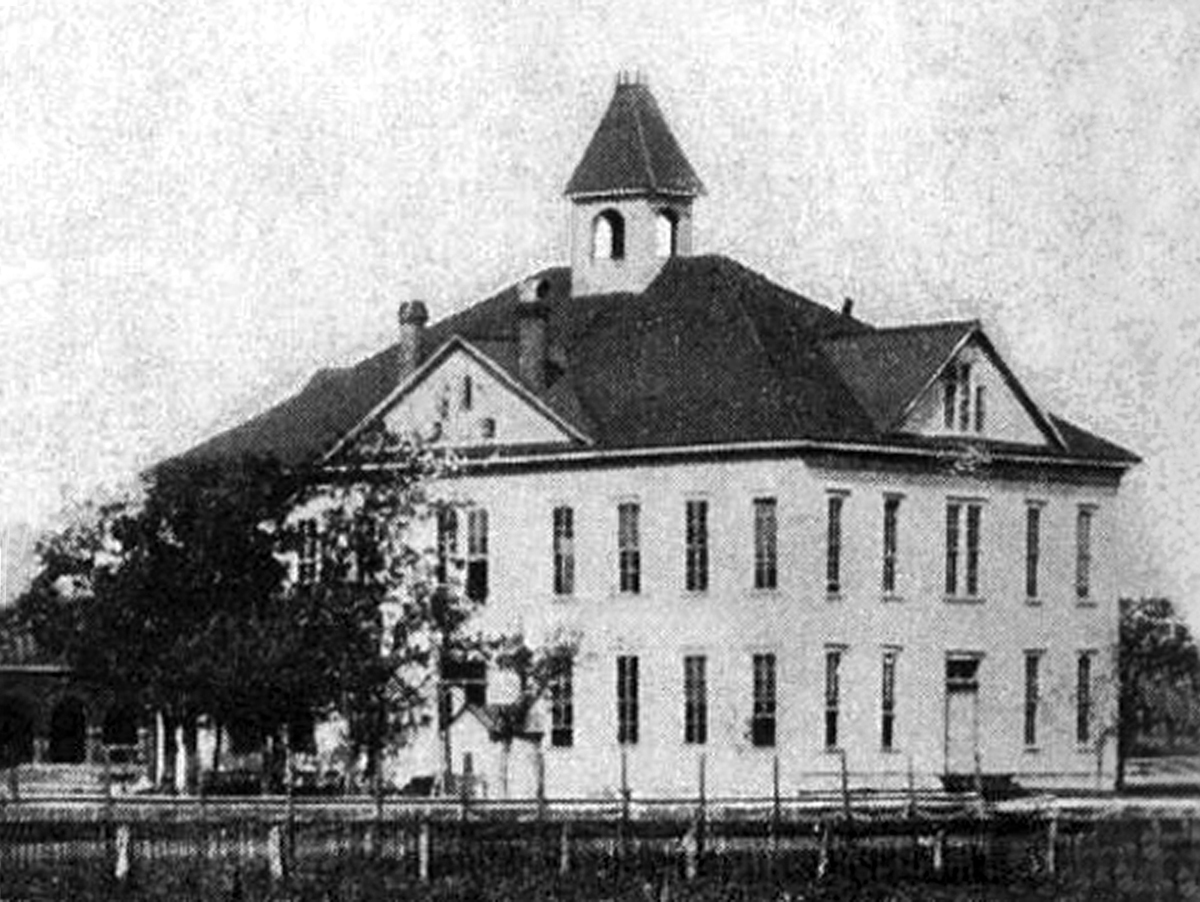
An undated image of the first building on the campus of Arlington College

The university traces its roots back to the opening of Arlington College in September 1895. Arlington College was established as a private school for primary through secondary level students, equivalent to the modern first to 10th grades. At the time, the public school system in the city of Arlington was underfunded and understaffed. Local merchant Edward Emmett Rankin organized fellow citizens of the city to donate materials and land to build a schoolhouse where the modern campus is now located.

Rankin also convinced the two co-principals of the public school in Arlington, Lee Morgan Hammond and William Marshall Trimble, to invest in and hold the same positions at Arlington College. In the first few years, between 75 and 150 students were enrolled in the college. The public school began to rent space at Arlington College, and was eventually sold to the city in 1900. The public school building became so unsafe that all of the space in Arlington College was rented for the 1901–1902 school year until the creation of the Arlington Independent School District in 1902. Although the public education system was set to improve, Arlington College was closed and the property was sold to James McCoy Carlisle.

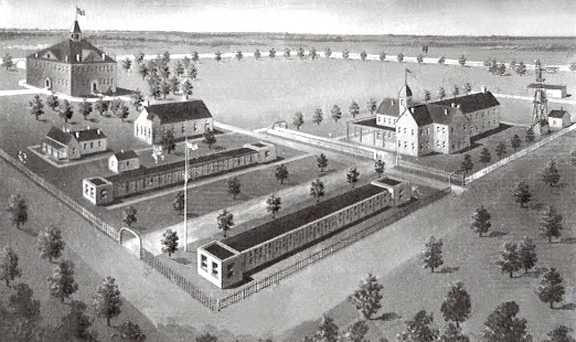
Bird's-eye painting of Carlisle Military Academy, 1911

Carlisle was already established as a respected educator in the North Texas region, and he opened the Carlisle Military Academy in the fall of 1902. His program consisted of a balance between coursework and military training. Enrollment increased to 150 students by 1905, and he began a large expansion of the campus. Baseball, football, basketball, and track teams were begun between 1904 and 1908. Around the same time, new barracks, a track, a gymnasium, and an indoor pool were built. The academy became known as one of the best at its level in the country. Unfortunately, enrollment did not continue to increase with the expansion in facilities and Carlisle ran into serious financial problems.

Lawsuits for the mortgages on the property were filed in 1911, and Carlisle Military Academy was closed in 1913. In the fall of 1913, Henry Kirby Taylor moved from Missouri, where he was president of the Northwest State Teachers' College, to set up another military academy called Arlington Training School. He also was required to manage the finances and campus for the property owners. By the 1914–1915 school year, the campus contained 11 buildings on 10 acres (40,000 m^{2}) of land with 95 students enrolled. The school was incorporated in 1915 to raise funds to make improvements to the existing buildings, but more financial problems arose and another series of lawsuits was filed. Taylor left Arlington, and the property owners hired John B. Dodson to establish a third military academy for the 1916–1917 school year called Arlington Military Academy. Enrollment was apparently very low, and Arlington Military Academy closed after one year.

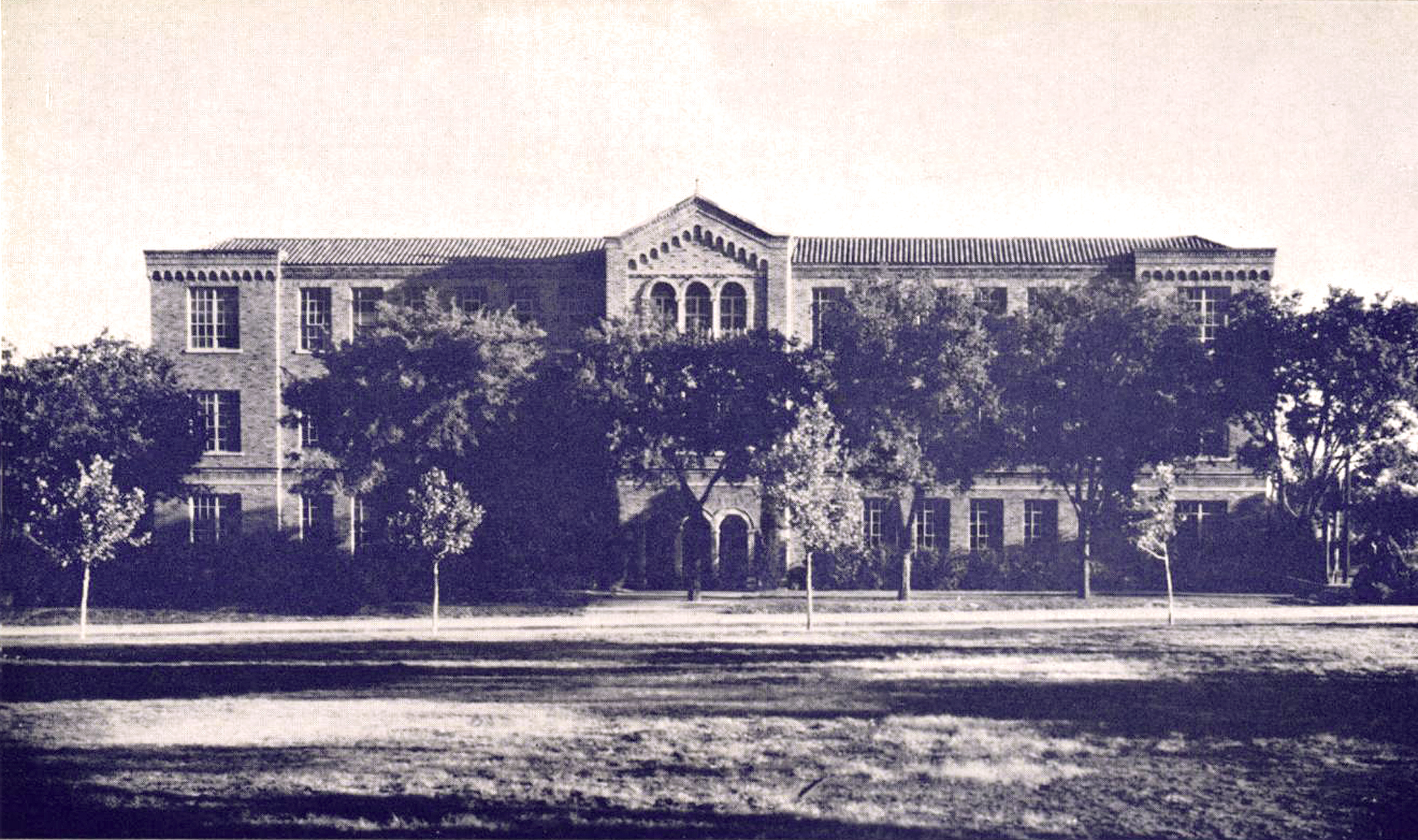
The Science Building at the North Texas Agricultural College in 1941: The building was constructed in 1928 and since has been renamed Preston Hall. It is one of the oldest surviving structures on the campus of the University of Texas at Arlington.

=== Texas A&M University System (1917–1965) ===
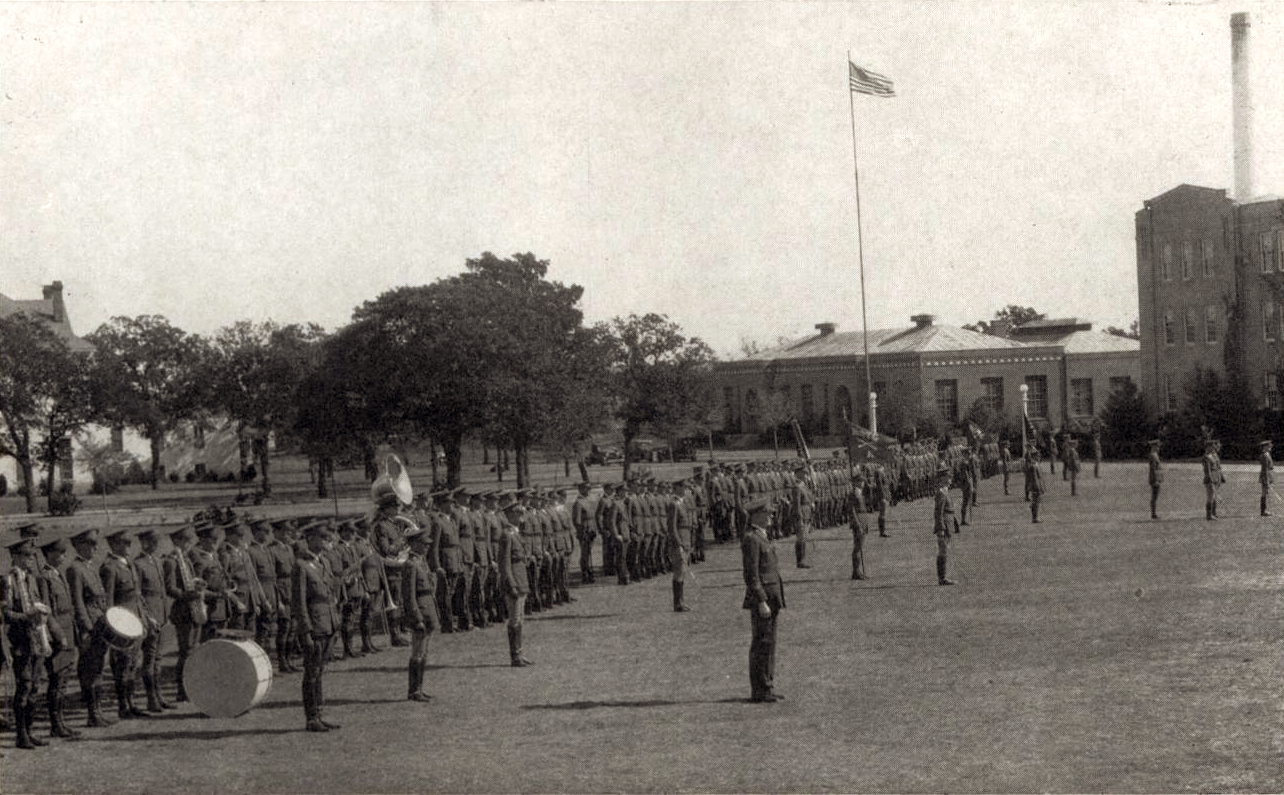
NTAC Corps of Cadets on the campus quad, 1920s

Since the turn of the 20th century, the prospects for turning the campus into a public, junior vocational college had been discussed. By 1917, the Agricultural and Mechanical College of Texas in College Station was overcrowded and had only one branch campus, Prairie View A&M. Vincent Woodbury Grubb, a lawyer and education advocate, organized Arlington officials to lobby the state legislature to create a new junior college. The Arlington campus was established as a branch of the Agricultural and Mechanical College of Texas and was called Grubbs Vocational College. Students were either enrolled in a high school or junior college program, and all men were required to be cadets. Its name changed again in 1923 to the North Texas Agricultural College (NTAC). Edward Everett Davis replaced Williams as dean in 1925 and held that position for 21 years.

The Great Depression resulted in major cuts to funding and a decline in students, so more general college courses were gradually introduced at NTAC instead of vocational classes. During World War II, the college trained students with a "war program" focus and participated in the V-12 Navy College Training Program, offered at 131 colleges and universities in 1943, which gave students a path to a Navy commission.

Davis was also an enthusiastic support of eugenics and believed in the inherent inferiority of Mexicans and African Americans in regards to literacy and genetics. He advised the leadership of the A&M System to consolidate the white-only schools, else they would "descend into decadence". Dean Davis appointed Ernest H. Hereford, then Registrar in 1942, to the position of associate dean in 1943. Following Davis's retirement in 1946, Hereford was appointed dean of NTAC.

In 1948, the Texas A&M System was created and Dean Hereford was named the first president of NTAC. The name was changed to Arlington State College (ASC) in 1949 to reflect the fact that agriculture was no longer an important part of the curriculum. Efforts began to turn ASC into a four-year institution, but the Texas A&M system board refused to consider the idea, since ASC could grow to be larger than College Station. The growth of the city of Arlington in the 1950s led to a major expansion of ASC. The student population increased from 1,322 in 1952 to 6,528 in 1959, which led to land acquisition and construction of many buildings. Jack Woolf was named president in 1959 as serious efforts began to make ASC a four-year college. The Texas legislature approved the four-year status on April 27, 1959. ASC's racial segregation would come to an end in the summer of 1962 due to NAACP member and Dallas lawyer Fred Finch, Jr threatening litigation on behalf of his clients Ernest Hooper, Jerry Hanes, and Leaston Chase III. President Woolf and Chancellor of the A&M System Harrington would announce the desegregation of ASC on July 11 of that year, and the following fall semester being the first ever to have black students be enrolled. Enrollment reached 9,116 students in the fall of 1963, a larger total than the Texas A&M College Station campus. Although Texas A&M proposed a reorganization for the system to recognize ASC's growth, A&M System President James Earl Rudder resisted developing ASC into a university with graduate programs. Rudder and the Texas A&M board of directors, viewing ASC as a threat to the College Station campus, withheld construction funding and blocked degree development.

=== University of Texas System (1965–present) ===
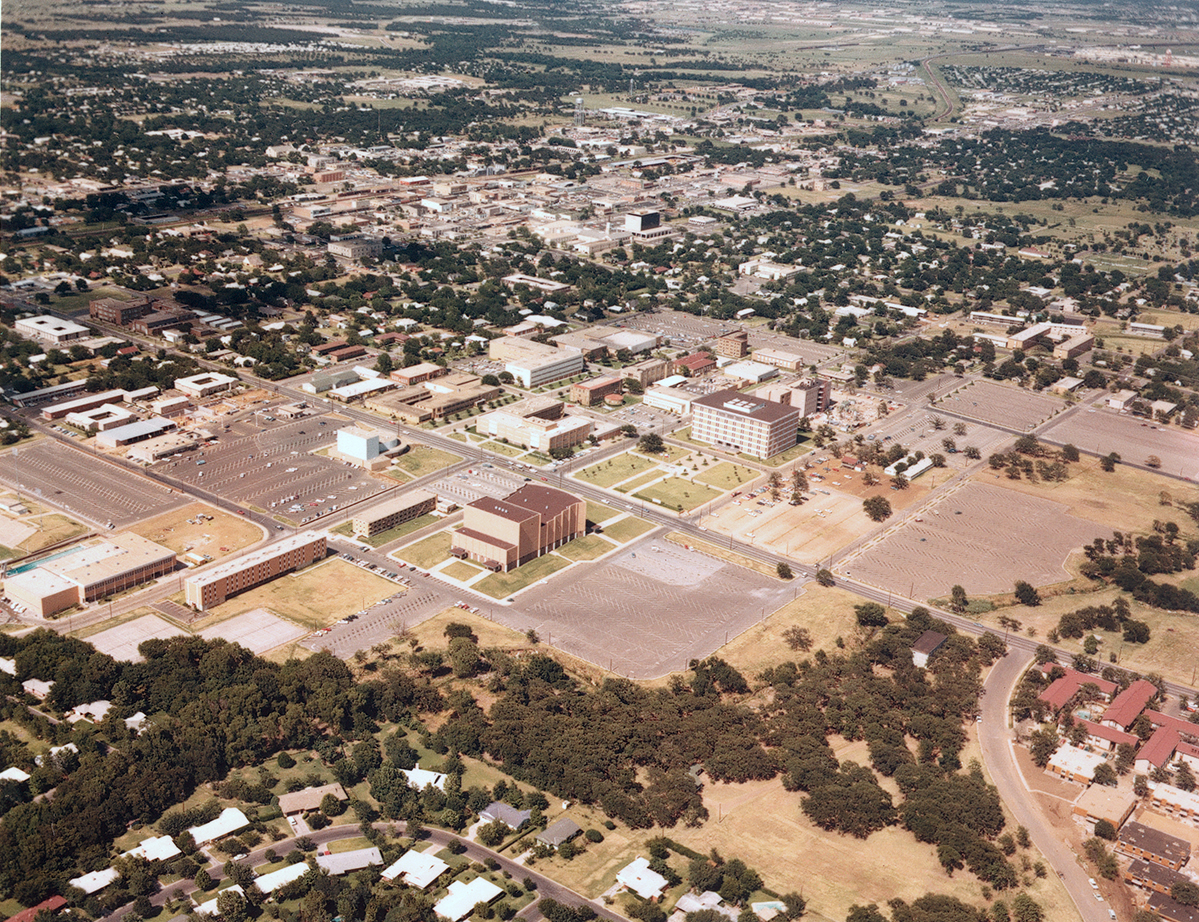
Aerial view of the University of Texas at Arlington campus in 1967

The decision by the Texas A&M University governing board to block development at Arlington State College led officials of the college and a number of Arlington citizens to enlist the support of Governor John Connally and key members of the Texas Legislature to separate Arlington State College from the Texas A&M University System and to join The University of Texas System. As part of a plan that reorganized several university systems in Texas, Arlington State College officially became a part of The University of Texas System on September 1, 1965. To reflect its new membership within the UT System, the university adopted its current name in 1967.

Joining the UT System was of immediate consequence. In 1966 the Graduate School was established with an initial slate of six master's degrees and new construction projects started.

Controversy erupted in the late 1960s over the use of a rebel theme that was started in 1951, including Confederate symbols and mock-slave auctions as campus traditions. After several years of efforts by President Frank Harrison to give students an opportunity to pick another theme, the UT System abolished rebels. The Maverick theme was adopted after a student vote in 1971.

Wendell Nedderman served as acting president from 1972 to 1974 and president from 1974 to 1992. His tenure was characterized by increased growth and aspirations. In these years, the graduate student population increased from 936 to 4,200 and the overall university enrollment reached 25,135 students. Faculty research and publishing was emphasized along with the addition of doctoral programs in science, engineering, business, social work, and public and urban administration. The Texas Select Committee on Higher Education recognized UT Arlington as an emerging research institution in 1987.

In May 2023, UTA alumnus Kelcy Warren gave the largest single philanthropic investment in UTA's history. He donated $12 million to grow the resource and energy engineering programs at UTA.

== Campuses ==
=== Main Campus surroundings ===
The 420 acre main campus is at the southern edge of downtown Arlington, which also includes the largest branch of the public library, City Hall, Theatre Arlington, Levitt Pavilion, Arlington Museum of Art, churches, and numerous types of businesses just south of the Texas and Pacific Railway line, around which the city was established.

The Barnett Shale formation sits below the campus and has earned the university millions of dollars from natural gas production since 2008. These funds are used for scholarships, faculty recruitment, and campus infrastructure upgrades.

Timber Brook, a tributary of the Trinity River via Johnson Creek, runs from the northwest end of the campus to the southern portion of the campus. The section along the south part of the campus is channelized, featuring a small impounding dam and promenade. This portion has been named in honor of Allan Saxe, former professor and local philanthropist. Cooper Street (which forms a part of Farm to Market Road 157) runs through the campus and provides access to Interstate 20 and Interstate 30. AT&T Stadium, Globe Life Park in Arlington, Globe Life Field, Six Flags Over Texas, and the International Bowling Museum are two miles to the northeast.

=== Main Campus architecture ===
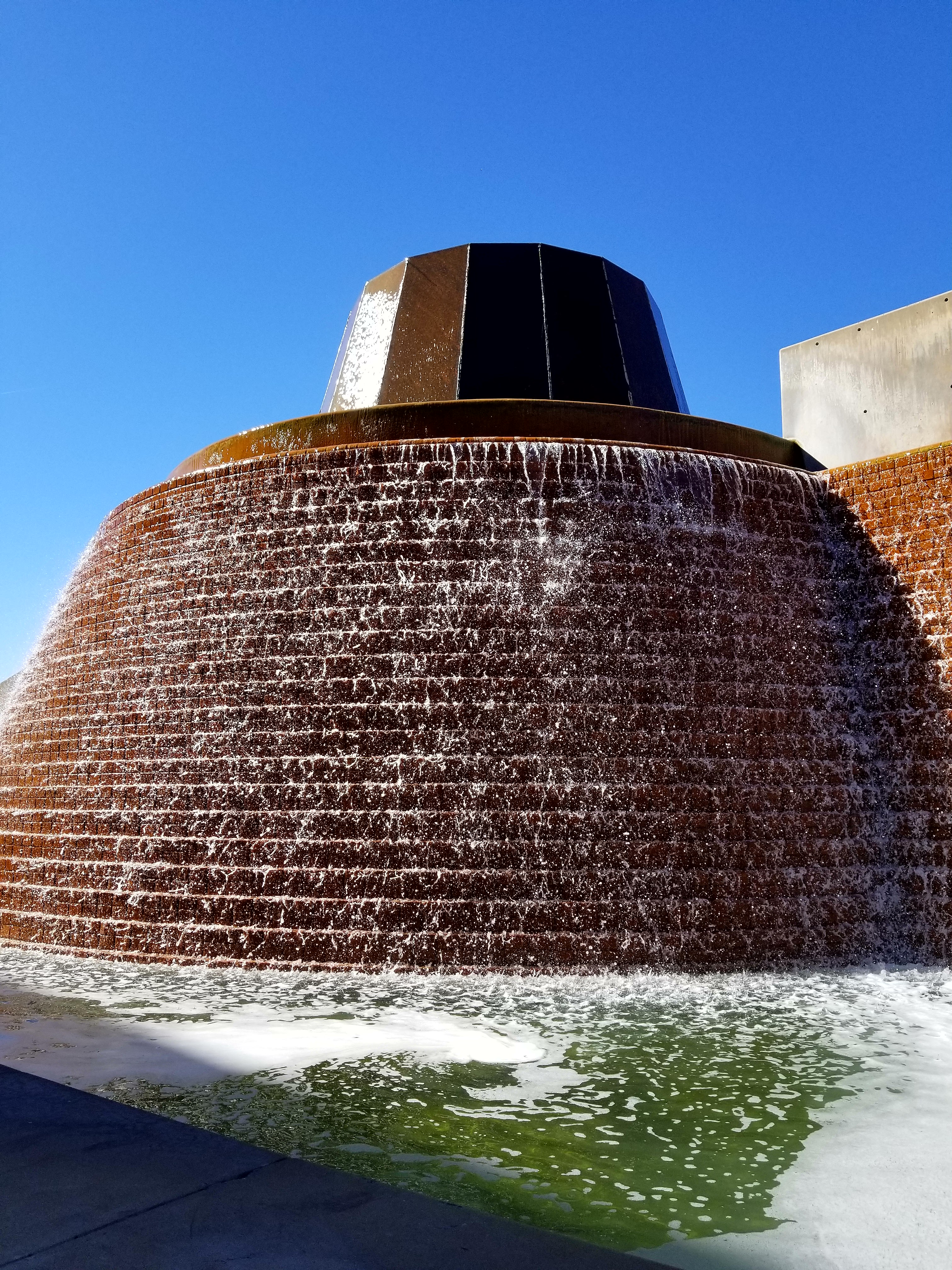
A fountain on campus

The campus is organized on the city's former street grid. The topography generally slopes to the south and east to landscaped creeks. The oldest buildings on campus, Ransom Hall, Preston Hall, and College Hall are on the Second Street Mall and date to 1919. The architecture of these pre-World War II buildings is traditional. Later buildings from the 1960s, '70s, and '80s are typical of much campus construction of the period: modern, functional, and not especially noteworthy. An exception is the Architecture Building (designed by the respected Dallas firm, Pratt, Box, and Henderson) which forms an intimate and visit-worthy courtyard; Pickard Hall, the Mathematics and Nursing Building, is noted for its unusual triangular shape. Texas Hall (George Dahl, architect) is a contributing building with its front portico, and Nedderman Hall is a contributing structure with its large atrium. An admirable feature of the campus is the aesthetic consistency of limestone and UTA-blend brick. Metal panels have appeared in construction since the late 1990s.

Recently as part of U.T.A.'s Land Acknowledgement announcement recognizing it is built on lands associated with the Caddo and Wichita people a section of the campus in front of the old planetarium was reconstructed to become a 'Land Acknowledgement Park.'

The Central Library, designed by George Dahl, forms one side of a Library Quad which may be regarded as the heart of campus. Attention to building design and the creation of outdoor spaces is evident with the postmodern additions of the Chemistry & Physics Building (Perkins + Will), Maverick Activities Center (Hughes Group with Page), Engineering Research Building (ZGF Architects with Page), College Park Center (HKS, Inc.), Science & Engineering Innovation & Research Building (ZGF with Page), Trinity Hall (Beck Group), and Nursing and Social Work (Smith Group). The Chemistry & Physics Building contains one of the largest and most advanced planetariums in the state.

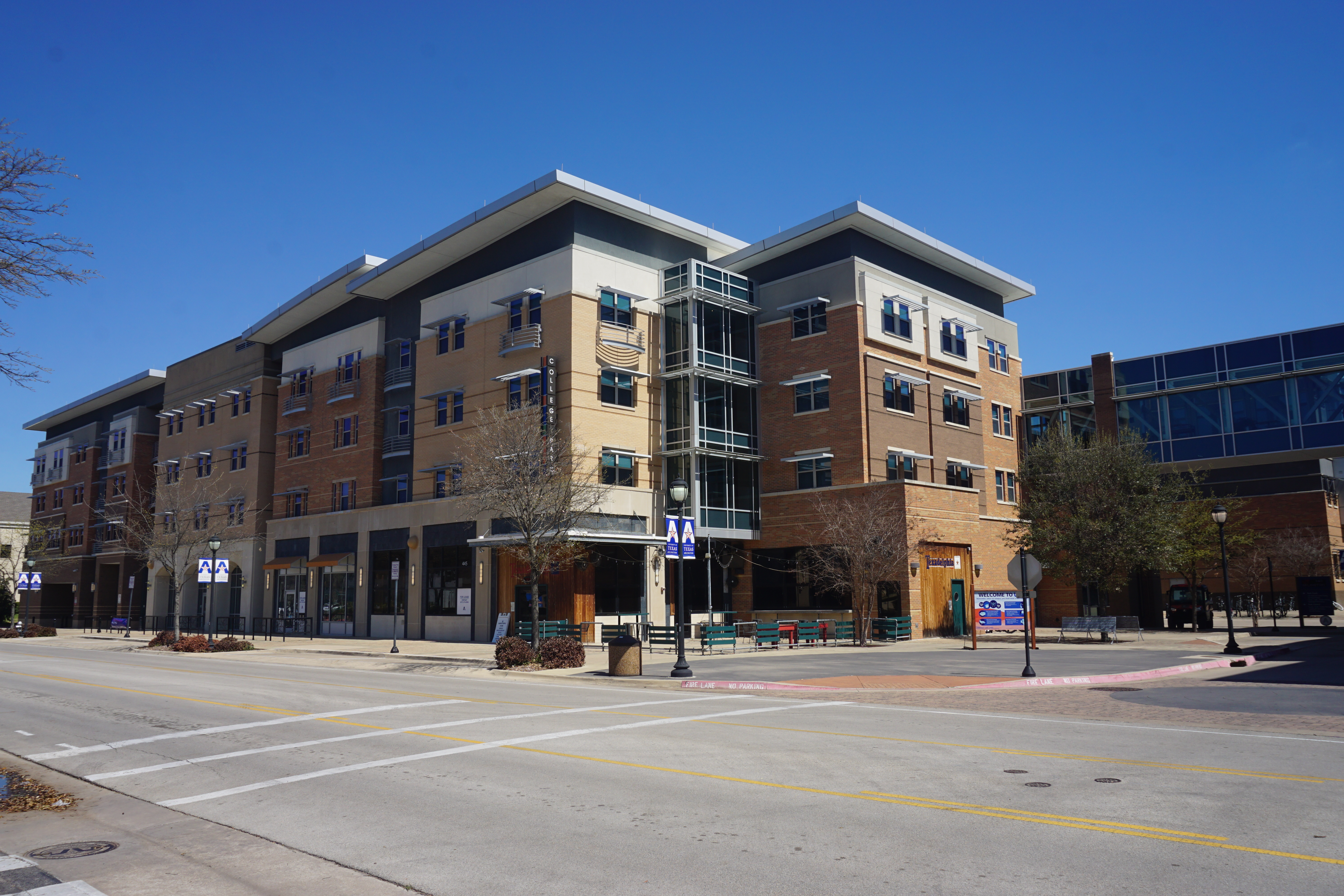
Vandergriff Hall at College Park

The north and east sides of campus have defined edges, being bounded by UTA Boulevard and Center Street, respectively. The south and west sides tend to blend more irregularly into the city. Cooper Street is a major artery that runs through campus and is partially depressed and spanned by three pedestrian bridges. Academic buildings erected over recent decades are on the east side of Cooper Street (defined by signage as "east campus").

Surface parking is pushed to the outer edges of campus, particularly south of the academic core, resulting in students getting more exercise than they may want during peak periods. The West Campus Parking Garage and the College Park parking garages on the northwest and northeast campus corners, respectively, provide some relief and advance the master plan goal of reducing surface parking. Green spaces, or outdoor rooms, have increased in the 2000s most notably with the creation of the Greene Research Quad, the Green at College Park, a sunken courtyard at University Administration Building, Brazos Park, and the Davis Street west campus edge. Located in various regions of campus are fiberglass horse statues with uniquely colored blue and orange patterns called "Spirit Horses."

The College Park District was completed in 2012 and significantly expanded the campus eastward. The district has an arena with seating for 7,000 spectators, dormitory, student apartments, retail space, an 1,800-car parking garage, a welcome center, a credit union, and a 5-acre park called The Green at College Park.

The on-campus resident population is over 5,000, creating a lively 24/7 environment. Large numbers of students live in Arlington Hall, Kalpana Chawla Hall, Vandergriff Hall, West Hall, Maverick Hall, and numerous on-campus apartments.

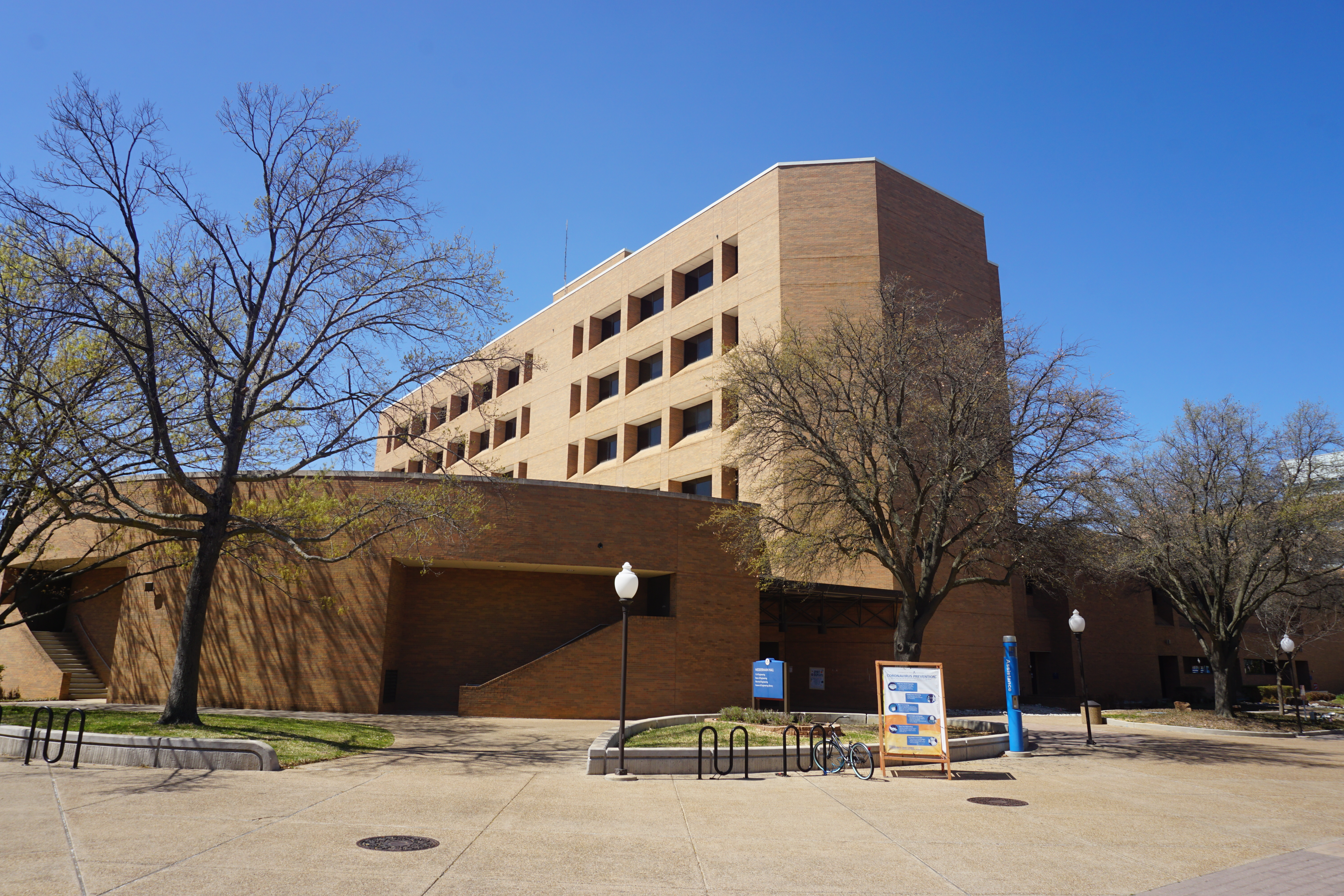
Nedderman Hall

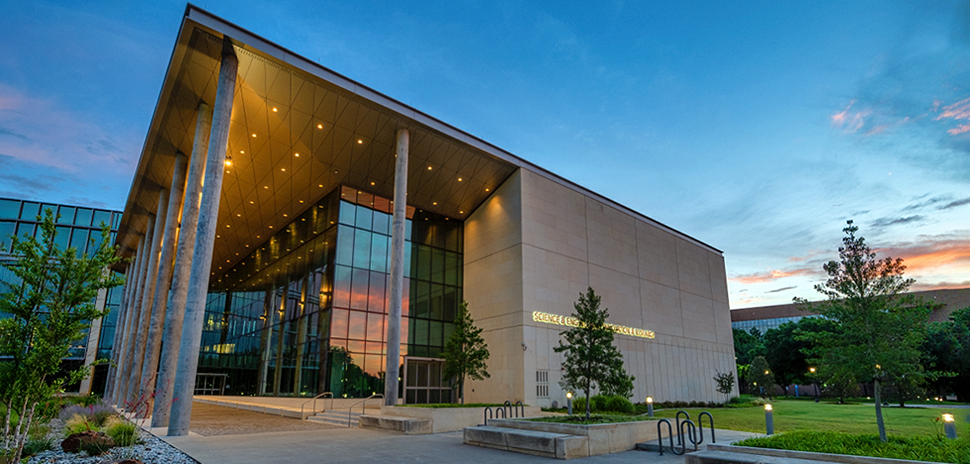
Science & Engineering Innovation & Research building

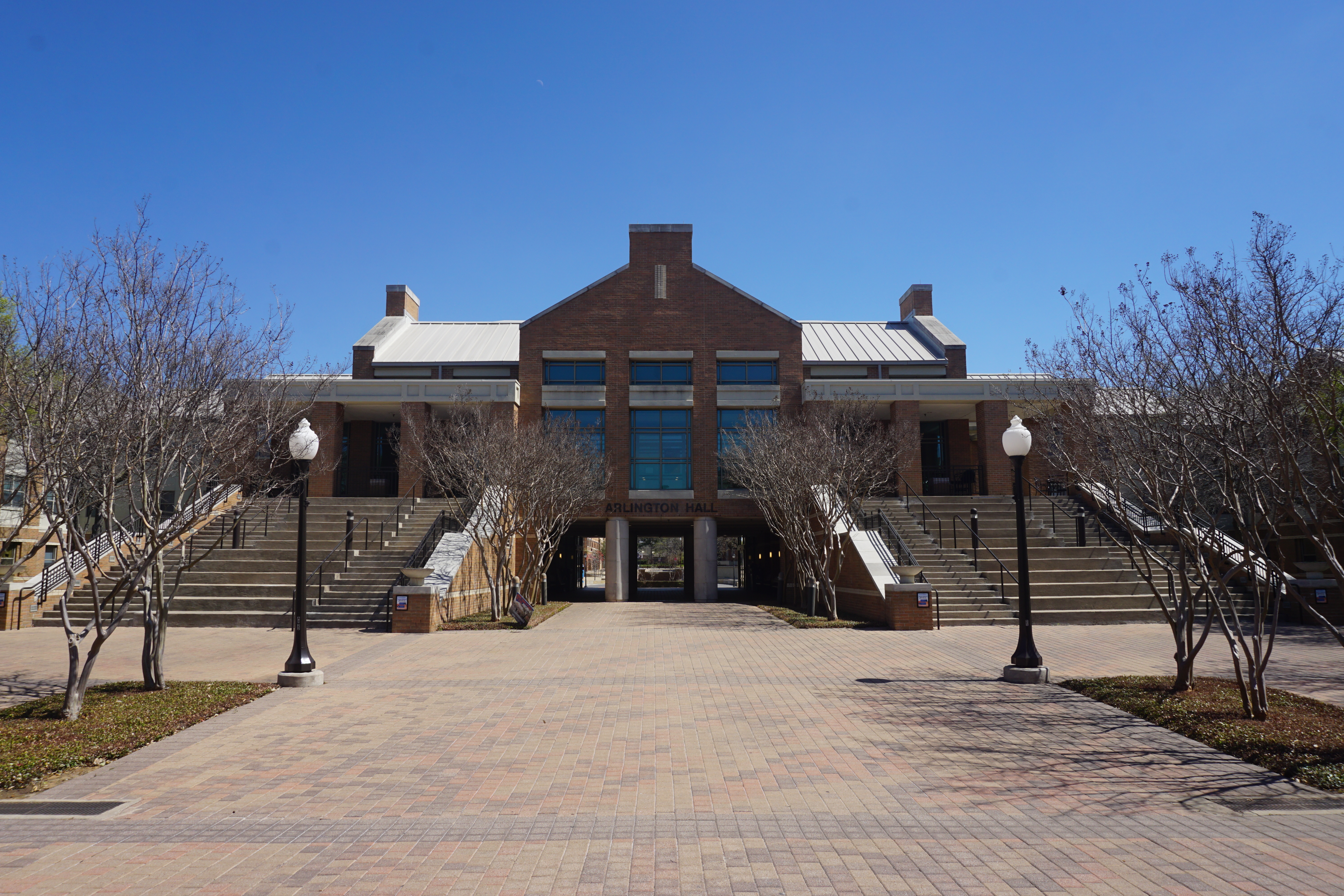
Arlington Hall

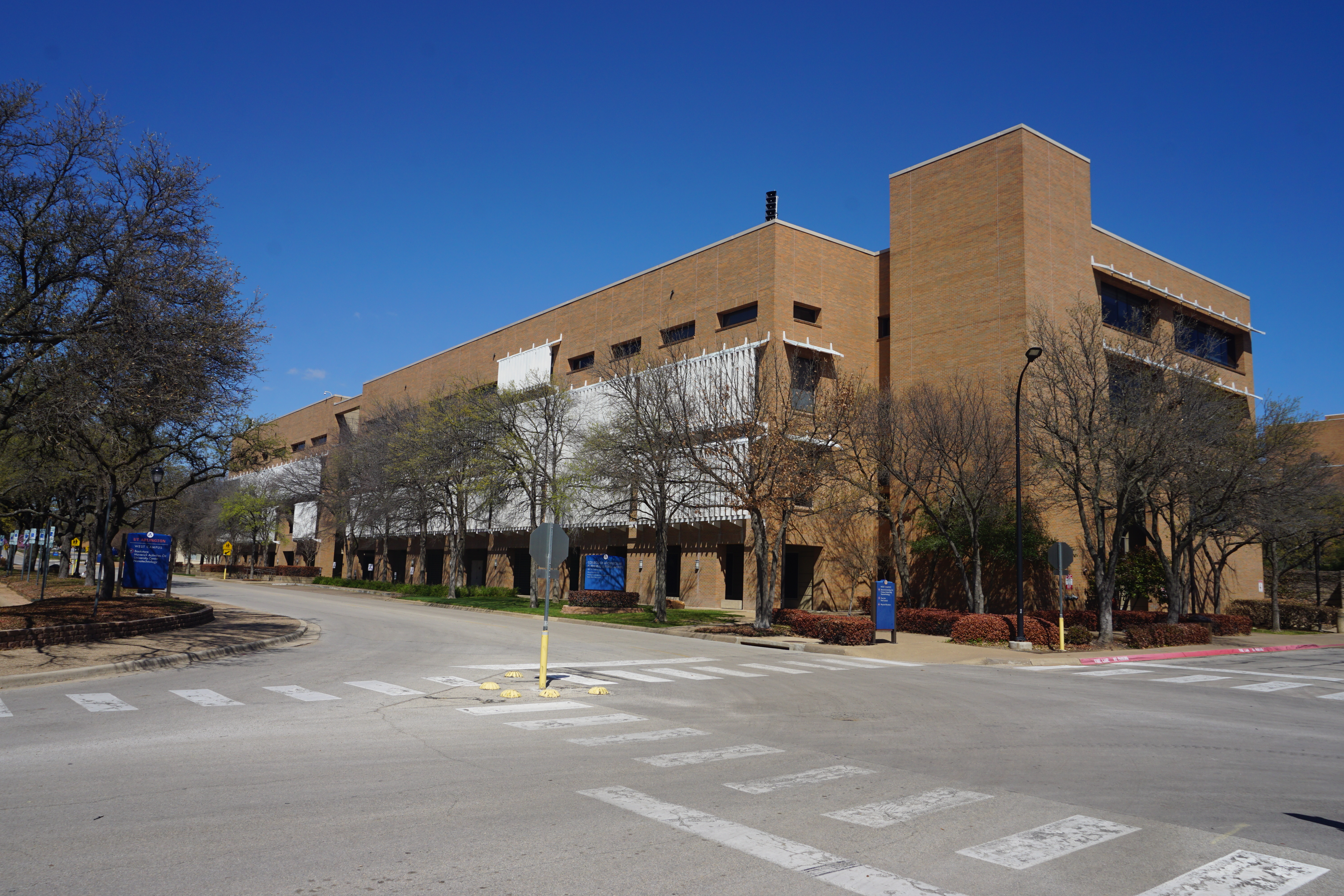
CAPPA Building

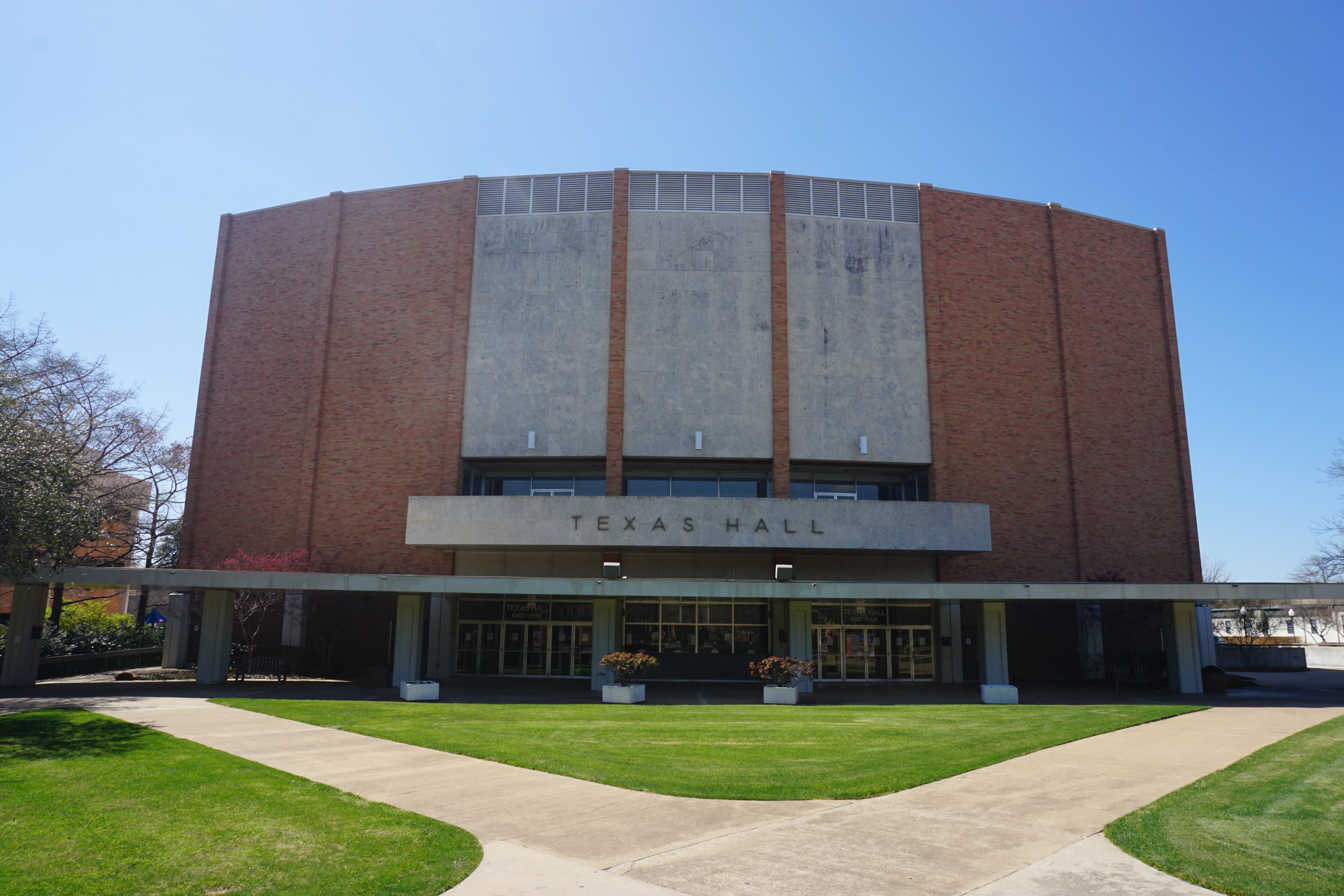
Texas Hall

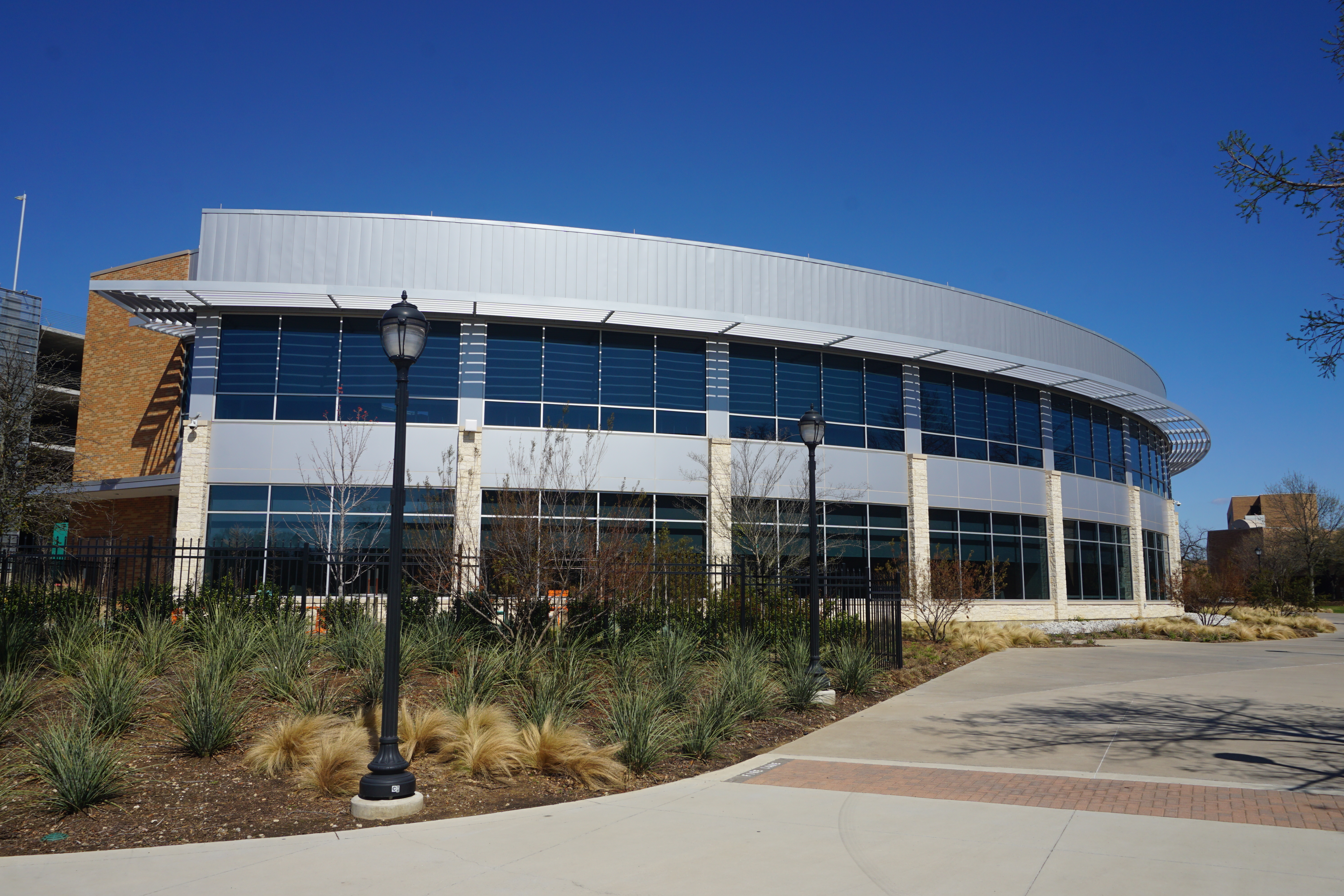
The Commons

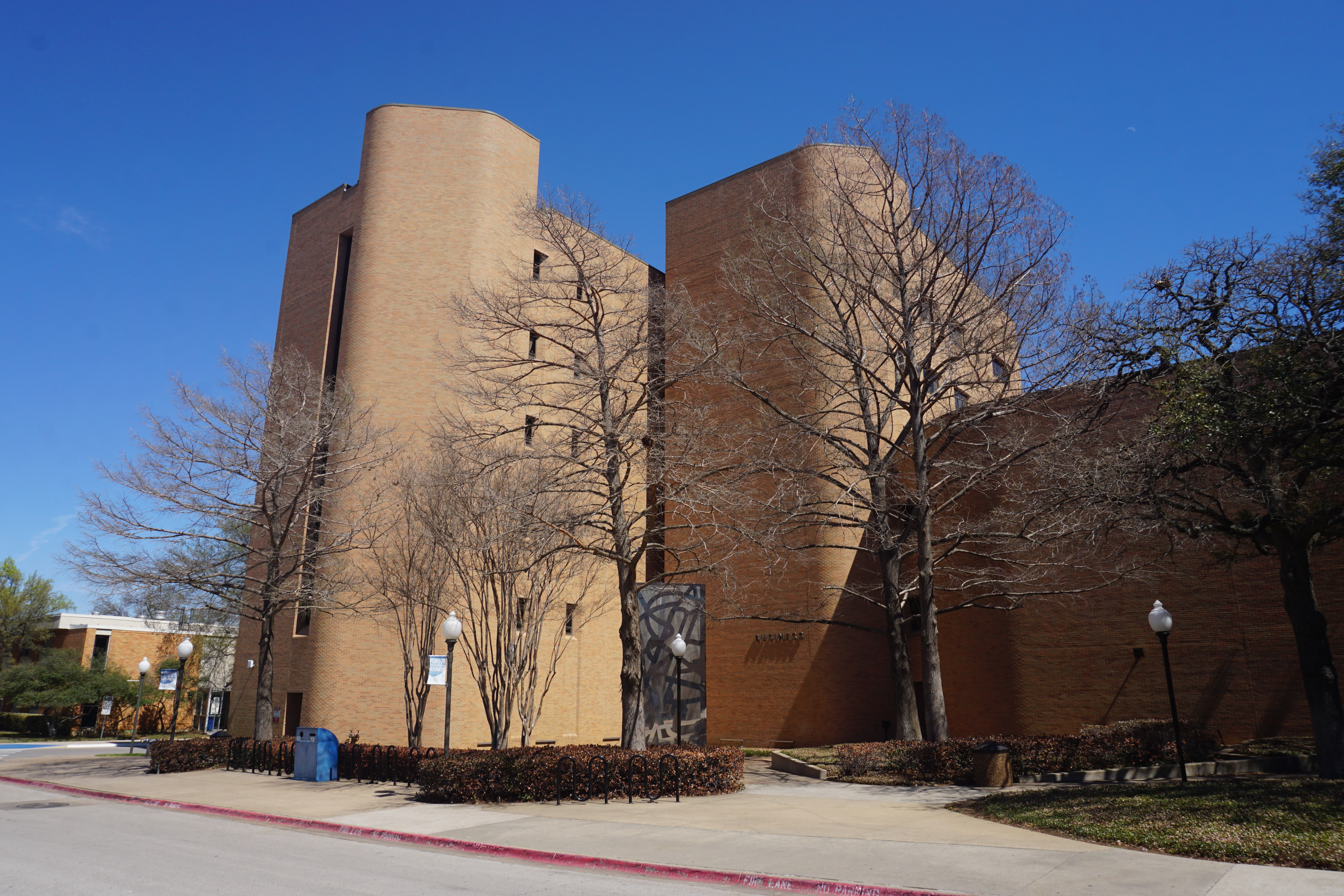
College of Business

=== Fort Worth Campus ===
In 2007, UTA opened the historic and renovated Santa Fe Freight building in downtown Fort Worth for educational purposes. Initially, UTA offered only Masters of Business Administration classes but later expanded to offering more classes for several degree programs on the graduate and undergraduate levels. The Fort Worth campus has over 25,000 square feet of classrooms, services, and amenity space.

=== UTA West ===
On August 5, 2024, the University of Texas System Board of Regents authorized the purchase of a 51-acre (21 ha) property funded by the Permanent University Fund to establish UTA West. Located in western Fort Worth within the Walsh Ranch development near the junction of Interstate 20 and Interstate 30 in Parker County, the university broke ground on the site in April 2025. Construction on the first academic building commenced in May 2026, with the campus scheduled to open to students in fall 2028 and long-term plans to serve over 10,000 students.

== Academics ==
Academic rankings

National
- Forbes: 253
- U.S. News & World Report: 231 (tie)
- Washington Monthly: 88
- WSJ/College Pulse: 216

Global
- ARWU: 701–800
- QS: 1,001–1,200
- THE: 601–800
- U.S. News & World Report: 793 (tie)

UT Arlington is classified among "R1: Doctoral Universities – Very high research activity". UT Arlington is the fourth institution to achieve designation as a Texas Tier One university giving it access to the state's National Research University Fund.

As of 2019, UT Arlington had 15 professors as fellows in the National Academy of Inventors which is the highest number of any institution in Texas and sixth highest in the nation.

The College of Nursing and Health Innovation produces the most registered nurses in Texas and is among the top five largest producers of registered nurses in the nation.

The College of Engineering offers eleven baccalaureate, fourteen master's, and nine doctoral programs. It is one of the largest engineering colleges in Texas with over 7,000 students. The engineering faculty includes over 50 fellows in professional societies. The school's graduate programs were ranked #69 in the nation by U.S. News & World Report in 2023.

The School of Social Work offers three main academic programs: the Bachelor of Social Work (BSW), the Master of Science in Social Work (MSSW), and the Ph.D. in social work. The BSW and MSSW programs are accredited by the Council on Social Work Education.

The College of Business is one of the largest and most comprehensive in the nation. The college ranked 128 out of 472 ranked programs in the 2018 U.S. News & World Report Best Colleges list. The part-time MBA program ranked 82 out of 470 programs and among the top 50 for public universities in the 2017 U.S. News & World Report graduate school rankings. The college has one of the largest executive MBA programs in China, and offers a U.S. Executive MBA program that features a study trip to China. CEO Magazine ranked the Executive MBA program No. 1 in Texas, No. 16 in the nation, and No. 21 in the world. The college's endowed Goolsby Leadership Academy is a highly selective cohort program for high-achieving undergraduate business students and distinguished faculty.

The College of Science consists of six departments: Biology, Chemistry & Biochemistry, Earth & Environmental Sciences, Mathematics, Physics and Psychology. The college offers over 50 bachelor's, master's and doctoral degree programs, including fast-track programs in select departments which allow students to earn advanced degrees in a shorter period of time than traditional degree programs. The college's faculty includes members of the National Academy of Sciences and the National Academy of Inventors as well as fellows in various professional organizations and recipients of numerous national, state, and UT System teaching awards. The college's High Energy Physics group is involved in ongoing experiments at the Large Hadron Collider at CERN and made major contributions to the discovery of the Higgs boson particle in 2012, working on detectors and computational data analysis.

Graduates of the College of Education had a 95% pass rate on the Texas state licensure examination during the 2014–2015 academic school year. The College of Education certification pass rates have consistently been above the state average.

The College of Liberal Arts offers unique programs such as Southwestern Studies and its Center for Mexican American Studies (CMAS) and Center for African American Studies (CAAS) offers minors in Mexican-American and African-American Studies, respectively.

UT Arlington has the only accredited architecture, urban planning, and landscape architecture programs in the North Texas region. The College of Engineering in conjunction with the architecture department is the first and only to offer a bachelor's degree in architectural engineering in the region as well.

The Interdisciplinary Studies program (INTS), a program under the Honors College, is one of the fastest-growing programs on campus. The INTS program allows students to custom build their own program of study resulting in either a B.A.I.S. or B.S.I.S. degree. Interdisciplinary studies is a 35-year-old academic field and the thirteenth-most popular major across the United States. The INTS program at UTA is the largest program of its kind in Texas. In building custom degree plans, students mix the required core components with various disciplinary components to meet the academic and professional needs of the student.

The Honors College is a selective interdisciplinary college for high-achieving undergraduate students of all majors and interests. UT Arlington's Honors College was the first to become an Honors College in North Texas and third one across all of Texas.

=== Colleges and schools ===
The university consists of 10 colleges and schools, each listed with its founding date:

- College of Engineering (1959)
- College of Liberal Arts (1959)
- College of Architecture, Planning and Public Affairs (CAPPA) (2015)
- School of Social Work (1967)
- Graduate School (1966)
- College of Science (1959)
- College of Nursing and Health Innovation (1976)
- College of Business (1959)
- College of Education (1963)
- Honors College (1998)

=== UTA Libraries ===
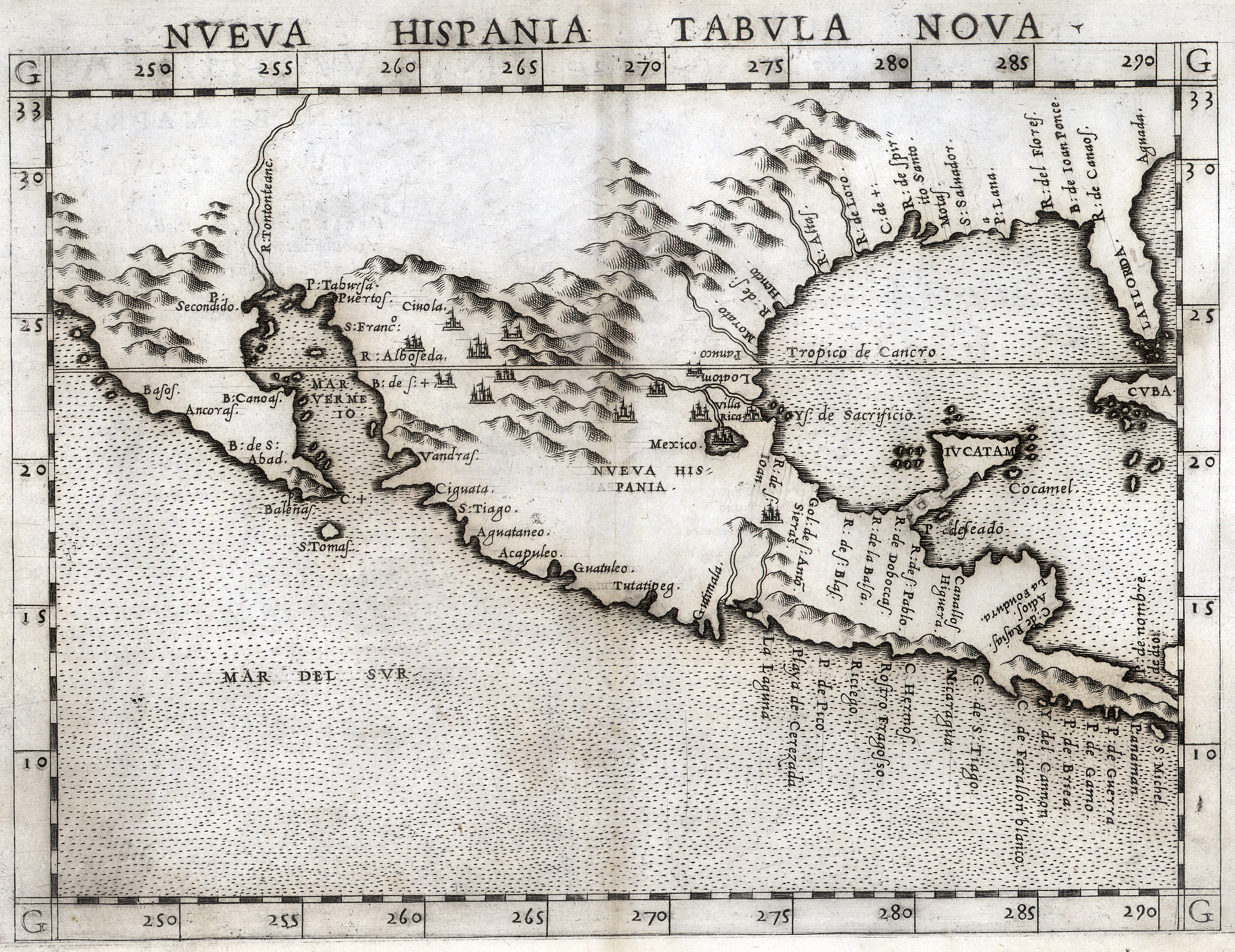
Girolamo Ruscelli's 1561 map of New Spain, Nueva Hispania Tabula Nova. Image from the UTA Libraries Special Collections.

UT Arlington Libraries have three locations: Central Library, the Architecture and Fine Arts Library, and the Science and Engineering Library. Central Library is open 24/7 during the fall and spring semesters.

The Libraries Collections includes historical collections on Texas, Mexico, the Mexican–American War, and the greater southwest. An extensive cartography collection holds maps and atlases of the western hemisphere covering five centuries. Also included is the Fort Worth Star-Telegram photo archives, a collection representing over 100 years of North and West Texas history. All together, Special Collections holds more than 30,000 volumes, 7,000 linear feet of manuscripts and archival collections, 5,000 historical maps, 3.6 million prints and negatives, and thousands of items in other formats. Some of the Library's more rare and interesting materials are available online in their digital collections.

=== Research ===
UT Arlington's research expenditure in fiscal year 2018 was $105.7 million. According to the university's Research Administration, total research expenditures for fiscal year 2019 totaled $117 million. Up 52% over five years. Some notable research institutes and facilities on campus include the Shimadzu Institute for Research Technologies (SIRT), the NanoFab Research and Teaching Facility, and the Center for Transportation Equity, Decisions, and Dollars, which conducts policy research into the political, and regulatory aspects of America's transportation systems.

== Student life ==
=== Student profile ===
Undergraduate demographics as of fall 2023
Race and ethnicity	Total
Hispanic	39%
White	23%
Black	14%
Asian	14%
International student	4%
Two or more races	4%
Unknown	1%
Economic diversity
Low-income (Note: The percentage of students who received an income-based federal Pell grant intended for low-income students.)	39%
Affluent (Note: The percentage of students who are a part of the American middle class at the bare minimum.)	61%

The U.S. News & World Report consistently ranked UT Arlington in the top 10 in the nation for achieving the most ethnically diverse undergraduate student body. Females account for about 55% of the total population. The top four countries of origin for international students are India, China, Taiwan, and Nigeria.

=== Residential life ===
The campus has four residence halls with a total capacity of at least 5,600 students. The university also has 18 on-campus apartment complexes and a limited number of houses for students with dependent children.

=== Traditions ===
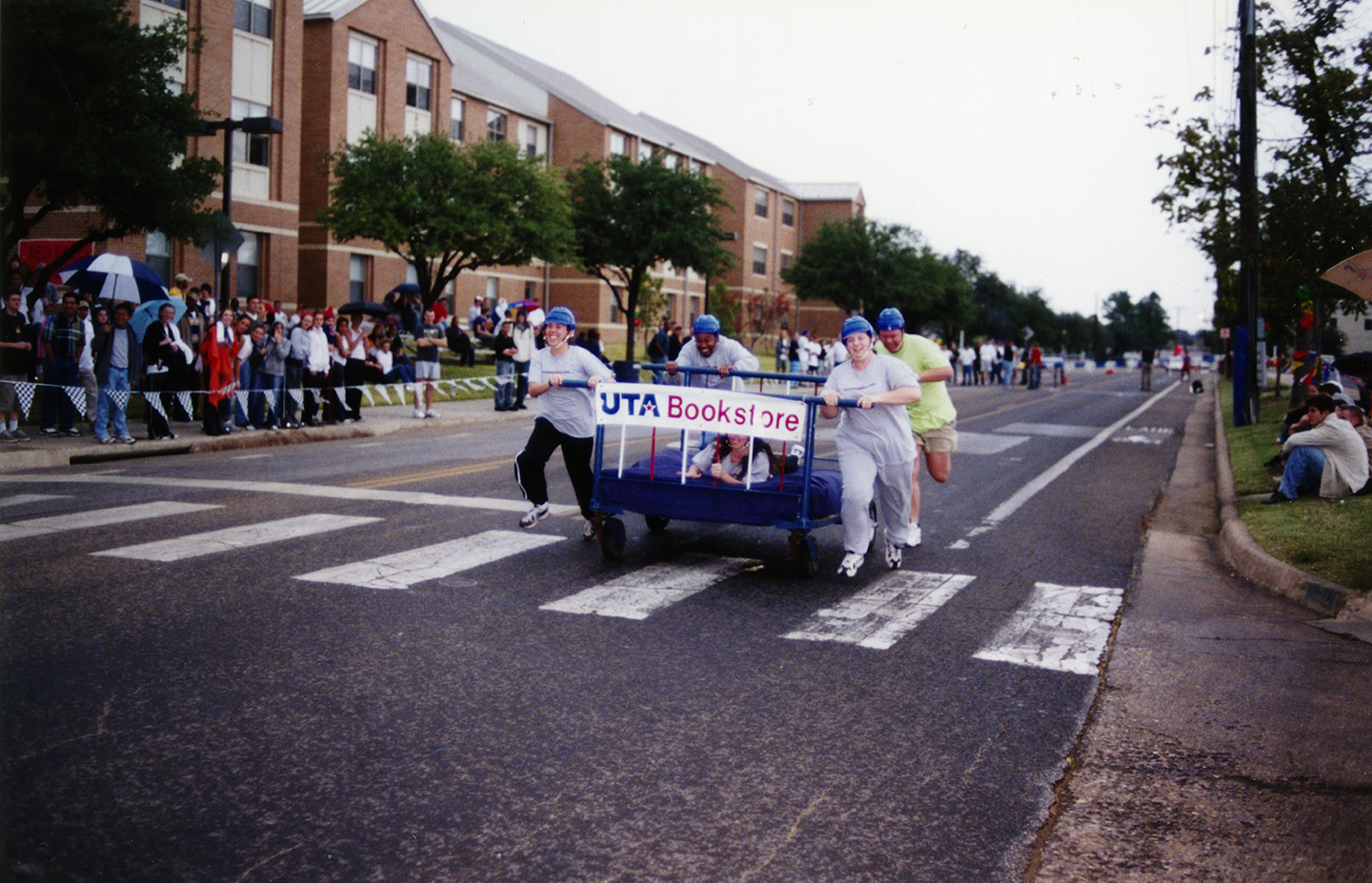
UTA bed races, 2002

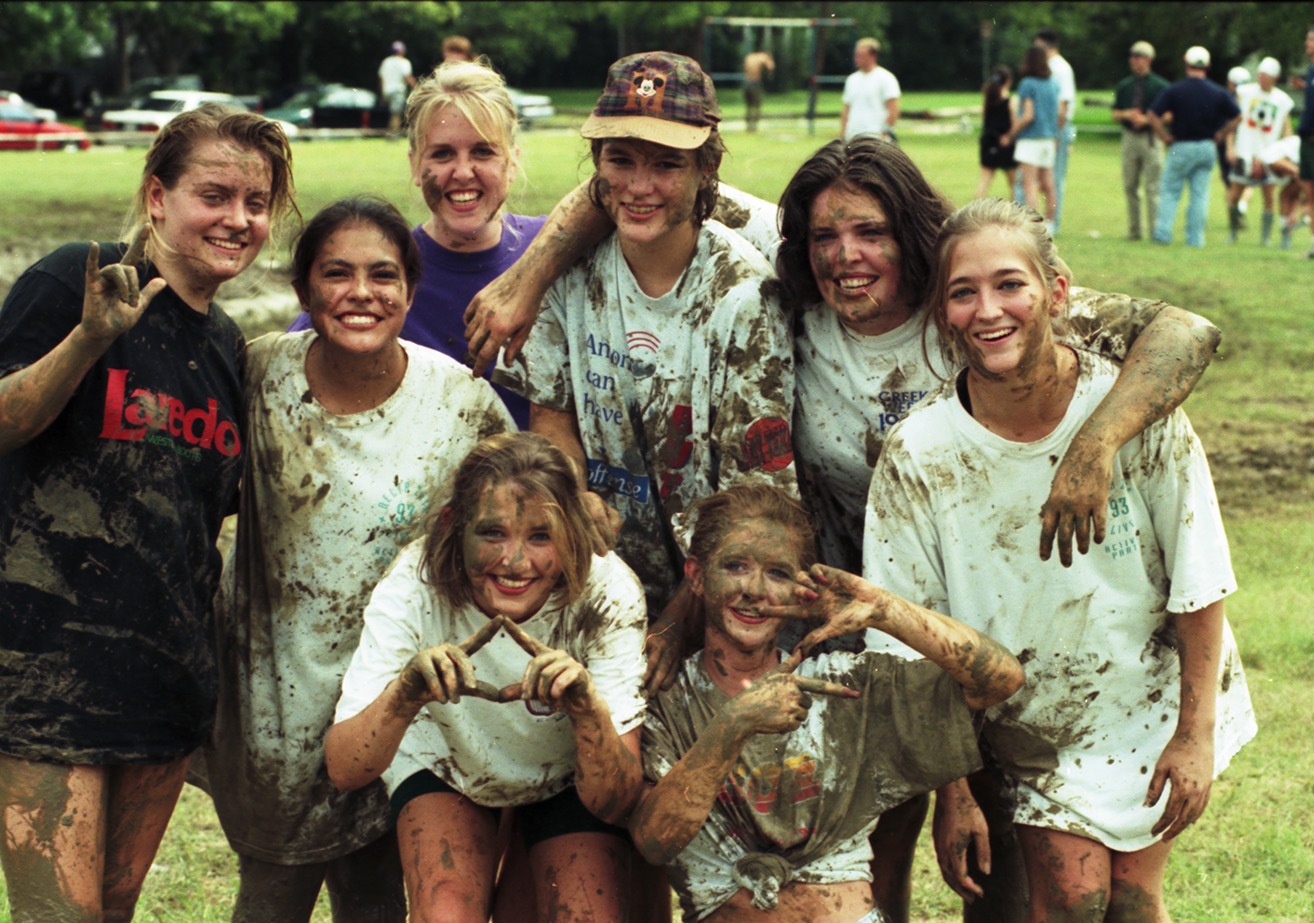
Oozeball at UTA, 1997

- Bed races: Since 1980, hundreds of students have gathered to watch teams consisting of four pushers and a rider race against each other in a race just over the length of a football field. Teams consist of student organizations, Greek organizations, and residence halls from around UT Arlington.
- Homecoming: Paired with the beginning of basketball season in the fall, UT Arlington Homecoming features numerous diverse activities. These include alumni events, The Bash, Boom at Noon firing of the Carlisle Cannons, the Parade, fireworks display, pep rally, and homecoming game match-ups.
- Mav swap: This annual tradition encourages students to trade apparel from their high school or another college for free UT Arlington gear.
- International Week, typically including a food fair, fashion show, and exhibits.
- Oozeball: An annual event hosted by the Student Alumni Association and Campus Recreation to raise money for the Student Alumni Association Sophomore Scholarship. Once the amount for the scholarship is reached, all excess funds are donated to charity. In Oozeball, students play volleyball in artificial mud pits. Since its creation in 1989 in the Greek Life community, Oozeball has become one of the most popular student traditions.
- Rubbing Hereford's head: Ernest H. Hereford was president of NTAC/ASC from 1946 until his death in late November 1958. His sculpted bust sits on a pedestal in the University Center, ever since it debuted in February 1959. Superstition holds that rubbing Hereford's head gives good luck on exams. The bust, and name of the University Center, have come under recent controversy regarding allegations of Hereford's administration being racist.
- UT Arlington Marching Band: one of the few college marching bands to exist without a football team. The band performs annually for crowds claimed to reach 100,000.

=== Greek life ===
The fraternity and sorority community at UT Arlington once consisted of dozens of national and local groups.

In 2019, national news services reported that all Greek life at Arlington had been suspended due to allegations of rape, alcohol abuse, and hazing.

== Athletics ==
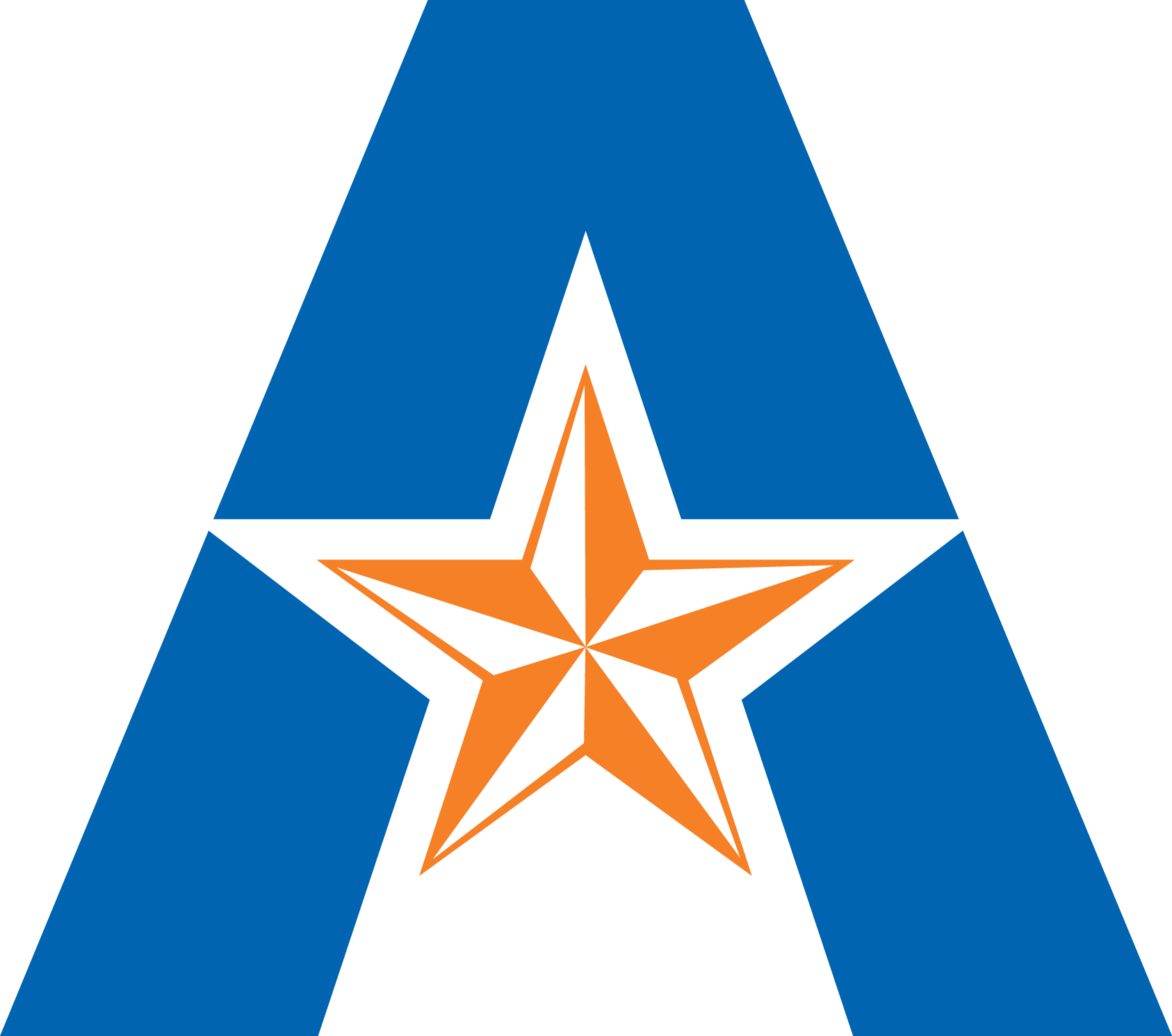
UTA logomark

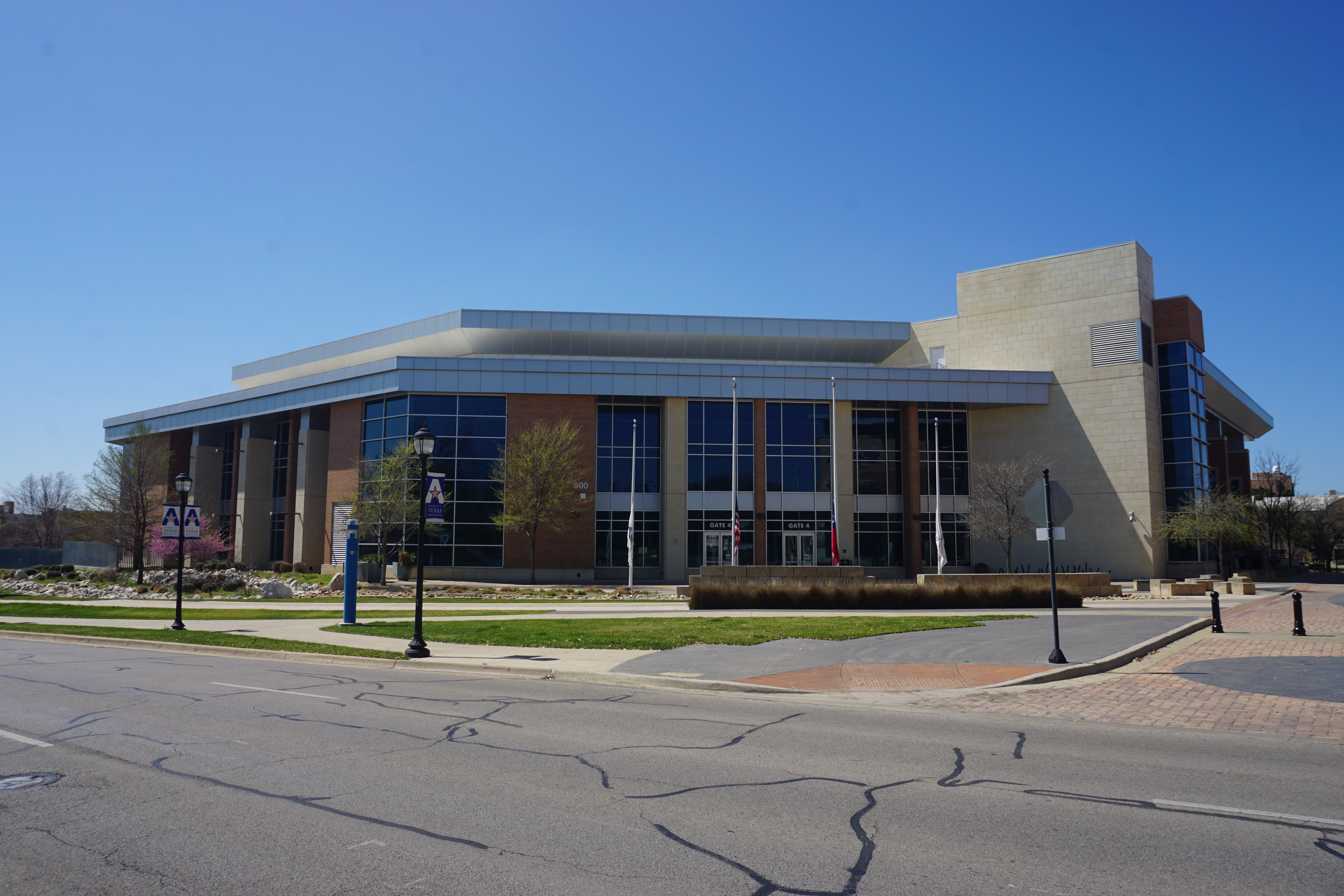
College Park Center

UT Arlington's athletic teams are known as the Mavericks (the selection was made in 1971 and predated the Dallas Mavericks' choice in 1980). UT Arlington was a charter member of the Southland Conference. UT Arlington won the Southland Conference's Commissioners Cup three times since the award was first instituted in 1998. The Commissioners Cup is awarded to the athletics program with the highest all-around performance in all conference events, including all men's and women's events.

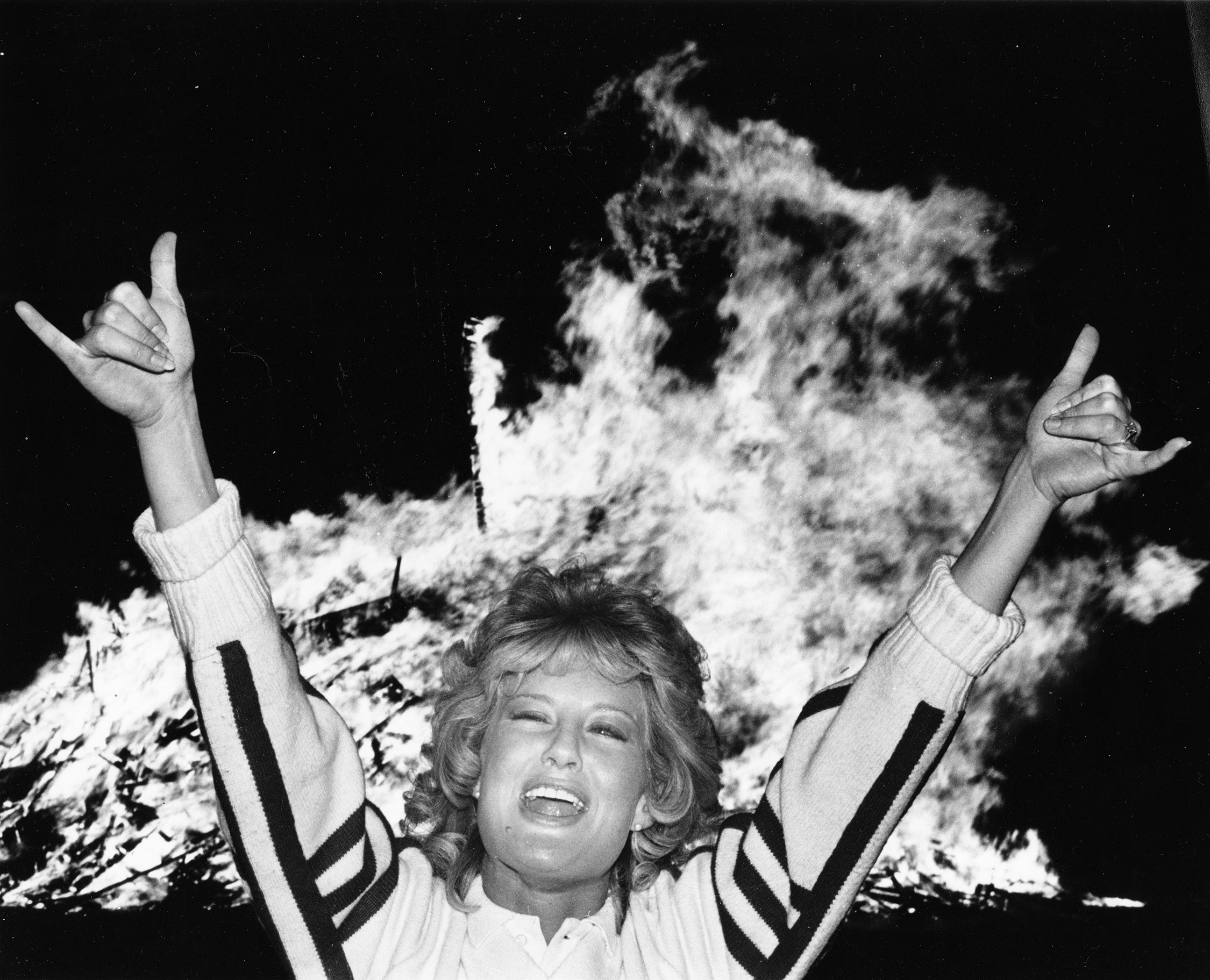
A cheerleader gives the "Go Mavs" hand symbol at the 1985 homecoming bonfire. The symbol is identical to UTEP's "Picks Up" symbol, but because of its resemblance of the letter "M" formed by the index, middle, and ring fingers, it is used by UTA to represent the first initial for the team name (the "Mavericks").

UT Arlington became a member of the Western Athletic Conference on July 1, 2012. After a single season in the WAC, the Mavericks joined the Sun Belt Conference on July 1, 2013. The switch came after continued shakeups in college conference membership.

A later phase of conference realignment in the early 2020s saw the Sun Belt Conference announce the pending addition of four new football members, bringing that conference's football membership to 14. Shortly after this expansion was announced, UTA announced that it would rejoin the WAC in July 2022.

=== Varsity sports ===
UT Arlington fields teams or competitors in 15 NCAA Division I events, including baseball, basketball (men's and women's), tennis, golf, softball, track, cross country and women's volleyball.

Volleyball achieved the greatest team success in the history of the university by advancing to the 1989 NCAA Volleyball Final Four. The women's basketball team played in the 2005, 2007 and 2022 NCAA tournaments; the men's basketball team made its first appearance in the 2008 NCAA tournament, losing in the first round against No. 1 seed Memphis, who was later forced to vacate this and all other wins from the 2007–2008 season. The men's basketball team earned a berth the National Invitation Tournament for the third time during the 2016–2017 season, advancing to the quarter finals. The quarter-final run included a win at BYU and two home games at College Park Center in front of large crowds (need citation). In 2011–2012, the men's team advanced to the National Invitation Tournament, falling to the Washington Huskies on their home court in a highly competitive game in the opening round.

UT Arlington fielded a football team, playing out of Maverick Stadium, until it was discontinued after the 1985 season. The university administration noted major financial losses of about $1 million per year and low average attendance (5,600, the student body at the time was 23,100). The program was funded by the university's auxiliary enterprise income while the other 14 sports were under-funded, as football accounted for half the total athletic budget. Discussions take place periodically about restarting football but have not gained traction as an institutional priority.

=== UTA Cheer ===
UTA's coed cheerleading team has become a perennial power in Division I competitive cheerleading. The team has been crowned National Cheerleaders Association Collegiate National Champions in 2010, 2014, 2015, 2016, 2017, and 2018.

=== Sports rivalries ===
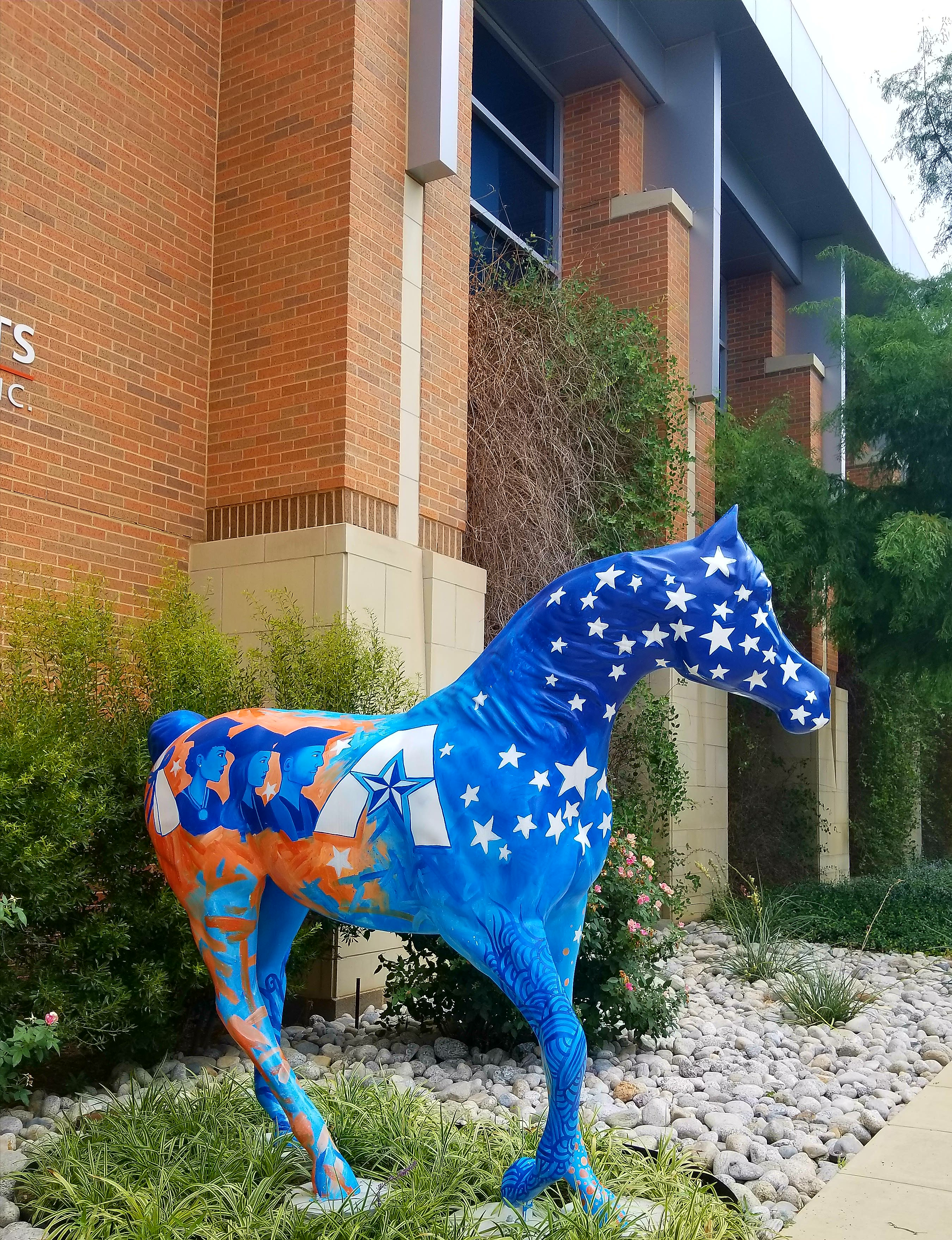
The Spirit Horse at the College Park Center

UTA maintains a relatively heated non-conference rivalry with the University of North Texas Mean Green. Periodic sporting events between the two are among the best attended for each team. The longest standing sport rivalry is in men's basketball, which began in 1925.

One of UTA's most anticipated baseball rivalries is with the TCU Horned Frogs. The two Tarrant County teams play annually in games that generate high attendance from both universities. 4,015 people saw the UTA/TCU match-up at Globe Life Park in Arlington in 2013. Five of the top nine most attended games at Clay Gould Ballpark feature TCU as the visiting team.

During UTA's nine years in the Sun Belt, the WAC experienced major membership turnover; when the Mavericks returned in 2022, the only WAC members who were in the league during their one season in that league was New Mexico State, which left for Conference USA in 2023, and Seattle. UTA joined five other Texas schools in the conference—Abilene Christian, Sam Houston, Stephen F. Austin, Tarleton, and UTRGV, though Sam Houston left the WAC for Conference USA in 2023.

== Notable people ==
=== University leaders (selection) ===
Presidents, deans, and other heads of UT Arlington and its predecessor institutions:

- Henry Kirby Taylor, Arlington Training School, 1913–1916
- Ernest H. Hereford, PhD, dean, NTAC, 1946–1948, and president, Arlington State College (ASC), 1948–1958
- Jack R. Woolf, PhD, president, ASC and UT Arlington (UTA), 1959–1968
- Frank Harrison, PhD, president, UTA, 1968–1972
- Wendell Nedderman, PhD, president, UTA, 1972–1992
- Ryan C. Amacher, PhD, president, UTA, 1992–1995
- Robert E. Witt, PhD, president, UTA, 1995–2003
- Charles A. Sorber, PhD, interim president, UTA, 2003–2004
- James D. Spaniolo, M.P.A., J.D., president, UTA, 2004–2013
- Vistasp Karbhari, PhD, president, UTA, 2013–2020
- Teik Lim, Ph.D., interim president, UTA, 2022-22
- Jennifer Evans-Cowley, Ph.D., president, UTA, 2022–2026
- Archie Holmes, Ph.D., acting president, UTA, 2026-present

=== Alumni ===
- Lanny Bassham, Olympic champion shooter
- Kalpana Chawla, first Indian-American astronaut and first Indian woman in space
- Pat Choate, economist, 1996 Reform Party candidate for vice president
- Waded Cruzado, educator, 12th president of Montana State University
- Roland G. Fryer Jr., educator, professor of Economics at Harvard University
- Ricky D. Gibbs (1982), US Army brigadier general
- Caitlin Glass, voice actress
- Marjorie Herrera Lewis, author
- Michael Langley, first African American Marine Corps general and commander, U.S. Africa Command
- Joey McGuire, current head football coach at Texas Tech
- Hunter Pence, professional baseball player
- Lou Diamond Phillips, actor and director
- R. Byron Pipes, educator, researcher in polymer sciences, seventeenth president of Rensselaer Polytechnic Institute
- Khalil Rabah (born 1961), Israeli-born Palestinian multidisciplinary artist
- Doug Russell, Olympic champion, and former world record-holder in three different events
- Robert L. Stewart, astronaut and first active-duty U.S. Army soldier to make a spaceflight
- Lisa Van Gemert, author and educationalist
- Sajeeb Ahmed Wazed, businessman, politician and advisor to the Government of Bangladesh on Information and Communication Technology
- Kelcy Warren, businessman, founder of Energy Transfer Partners

== Sources ==
- Saxon, Gerald D. (1995). Transitions: A Centennial History of the University of Texas at Arlington, 1895–1995. Arlington, Texas: UTA Press. ISBN 0932408192. Archived from the original on June 22, 2019.
- Barker, Evelyn; Worcester, Lea (2015). University of Texas at Arlington. Charleston, South Carolina: Arcadia Publishing. ISBN 9781439649732.
