= College of Architecture, Planning and Public Affairs =

The College of Architecture, Planning and Public Affairs
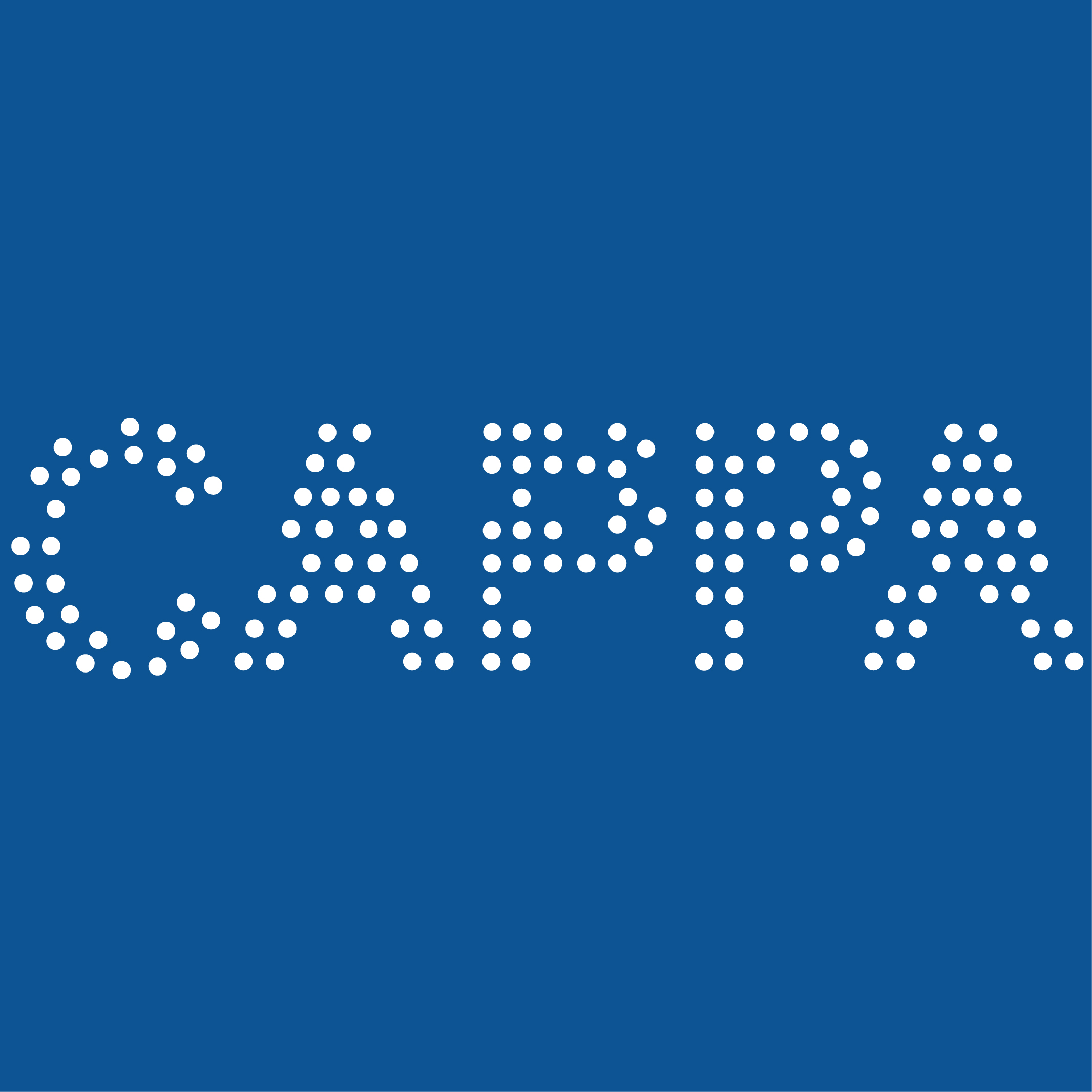
- Dean: Ming-Han Li
- Location: Arlington, Texas, Texas, U.S. 32.730927°N 97.116126°W
- Website: http://www.uta.edu/cappa

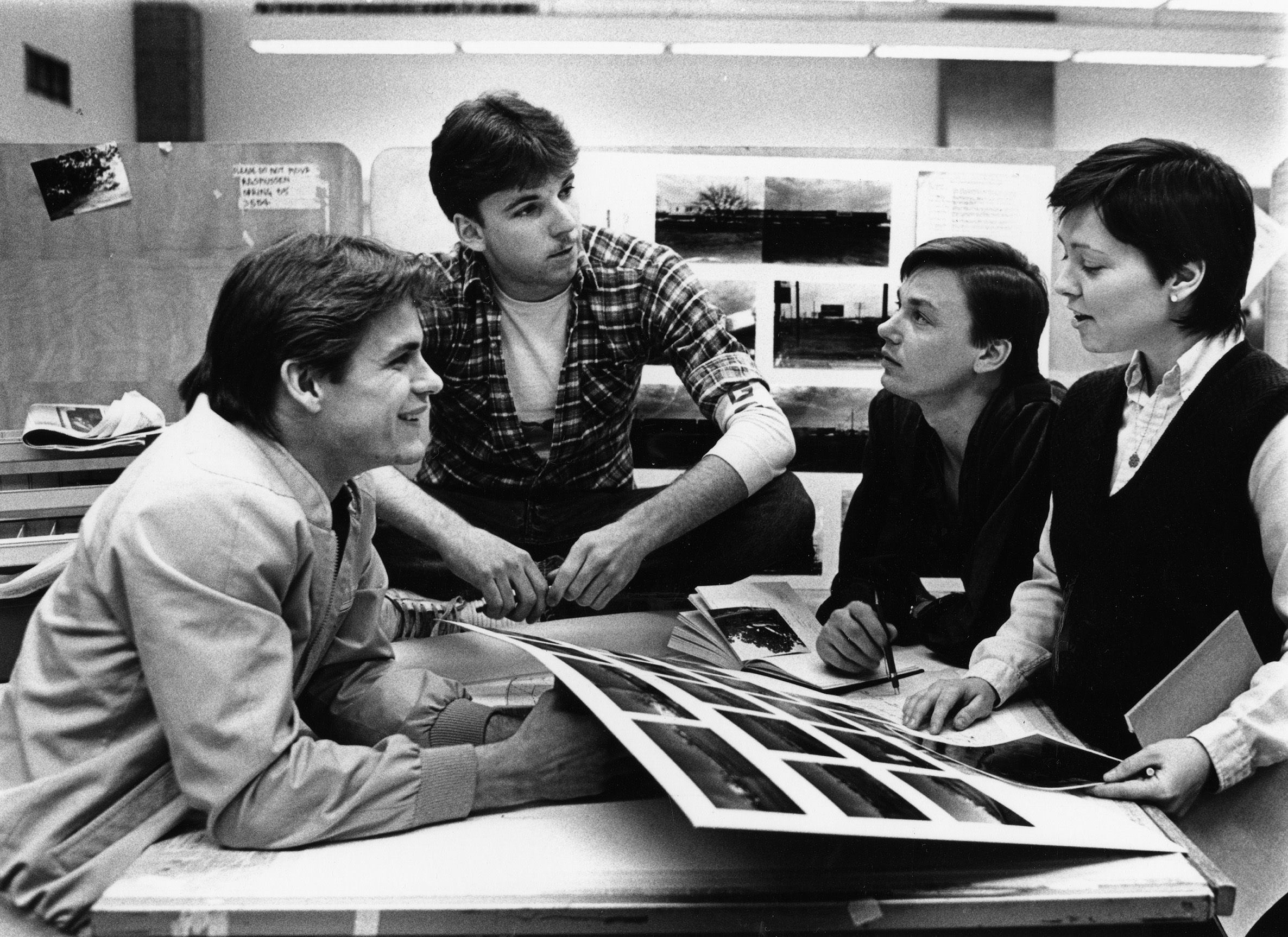
University of Texas at Arlington Architecture students working in classroom, circa 1970-88

The College of Architecture, Planning and Public Affairs at the University of Texas at Arlington is a professional school of design located in Arlington, Texas. In 2015, The University of Texas at Arlington’s School of Architecture and School of Urban and Public Affairs united to form the College of Architecture, Planning and Public Affairs (CAPPA). The integration of the two schools strengthened the academic and research opportunities available for students and faculty at UTA and provides nationally ranked programs that are unique to the Dallas–Fort Worth region. UTA is the only university in the North Texas region to offer degree programs in architecture, landscape architecture and urban planning.

CAPPA offers internationally recognized degrees in architecture, interior design and landscape architecture. Design Intelligence, a national evaluating service based in Washington, D.C., ranked the University’s landscape architecture program No. 13 in the nation for 2013.

The college also hosts the Institute of Urban Studies, contributes to the Arlington Urban Design Center at Arlington City Hall and offers graduate degrees in city and regional planning, public administration, urban planning and public policy, and others. The Master of Public Administration was listed on U.S. News & World Report’s 2014 list of best public affairs programs.
