= Robert Witt (academic administrator) =

President of University of Alabama

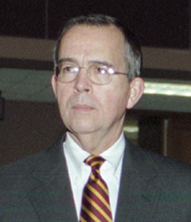

Chancellor of the University of Alabama System
- In office May 5, 2012 – September 1, 2016
- Preceded by: Malcolm Portera
- Succeeded by: Ray Hayes

President of the University of Alabama
- In office 2003–2012
- Preceded by: J. Barry Mason
- Succeeded by: Guy Bailey

President of the University of Texas, Arlington
- In office 1995 – 2003; Acting: 1995–1996
- Preceded by: Ryan C. Amacher
- Succeeded by: Charles A. Sorber

Personal details
- Born: September 16, 1940 (age 85) Bridgeport, Connecticut, U.S.
- Party: Republican
- Spouse: Sandy Witt
- Education: Bates College (BA); Dartmouth College (MBA); Pennsylvania State University (PhD)

Robert E. Witt (born September 16, 1940) is an American businessman, and academic administrator. He is the former Chancellor of the University of Alabama System, concurrently serving as the Chairman of the Council of Presidents of Alabama’s public colleges and universities.

== Early life and education ==
Witt received his bachelor's degree in economics in 1962 from Bates College, his M.B.A. from the Tuck School of Business at Dartmouth College and his Ph.D. from Pennsylvania State University. He is also a member of the Phi Delta Theta fraternity. He is an Episcopalian.

== Academic career ==
=== University of Texas at Austin ===
Witt joined the business school faculty at the University of Texas at Austin in 1968, and rose through the ranks as chair and associate dean. He was named the Zale Corporation Centennial Professor in Business in 1983. Two years later he was named to the Mortimer Centennial Professorship in Business and that year became acting dean of business. In 1985, he was named dean, a position he would hold for nine years.

=== University of Texas at Arlington ===
In 1995, Witt joined the University of Texas at Arlington as interim president. He was named permanent president in 1996. His accomplishments at UT-Arlington included:

- Partnering with the Chamber of Commerce to establish the Arlington Technology Incubator
- Creating a nanotechnology research and teaching facility
- Establishing the University's first alliance of African-American ministers and community leaders.

=== University of Alabama ===
In 2003, Witt left the University of Texas at Arlington to become President of the University of Alabama. On May 5, 2012, Witt was appointed as the Chancellor of the University of Alabama System.

== Honors ==
Witt was awarded an honorary degree from Bates College, in Lewiston, Maine on May 29, 2016.
