= J. Barry Mason =

American academic

President of the University of Alabama (acting)
- In office 2002–2003
- Preceded by: Andrew Sorensen
- Succeeded by: Robert Witt

Personal details
- Born: March 24, 1941 (age 85) Memphis, Tennessee, U.S.
- Education: Louisiana Tech University; University of Alabama

J. Barry Mason (born March 24, 1941) is an American academic. He served as acting president of University of Alabama from 2002 to 2003. Mason was also the dean of the College of Commerce and Business Administration at the University of Alabama. He attended Louisiana Tech University where he earned his bachelor's degrees, and then later attended the University of Alabama where he earned his master's and PhD degrees.
