= E. Roger Sayers =

American academic

President of the University of Alabama
- In office 1988–1996
- Preceded by: Joab Thomas
- Succeeded by: Andrew Sorensen

Personal details
- Born: February 15, 1936 (age 90) Sterling, Illinois, U.S.
- Education: University of Illinois; Cornell University

Earl Roger Sayers (born July 20, 1936) is an American academic. He served as president of University of Alabama from 1988 to 1996. Sayers attended the University of Illinois (B.S.) and Cornell University (M.S., PhD), in agronomy.
