= History of the University of Texas at Arlington =

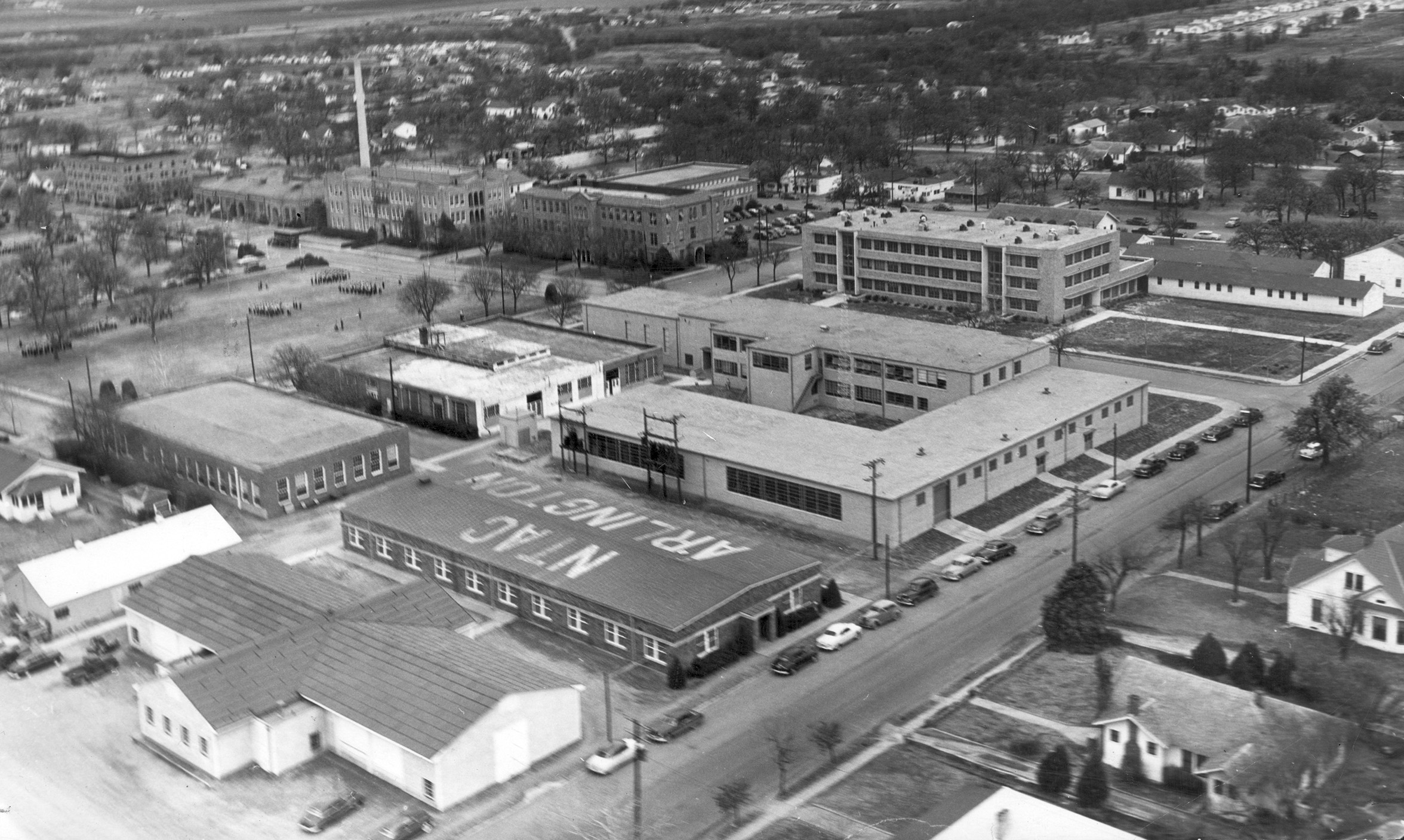
Aerial view of the Arlington State College campus, circa 1950–51

The history of the University of Texas at Arlington began with the foundation of Arlington College in 1895, which was the first of a series of private schools to exist on the site of the present university. Created largely due to the underfunded and generally inadequate public schools in the city, it closed in July 1902 after Arlington voters passed a proposition to create an independent school district. Carlisle Military Academy was established on the same site by Colonel James M. Carlisle in 1902. It was molded by Carlisle's educational philosophy, which balanced intellectualism with military training. Carlisle's financial problems resulted in the school entering receivership in 1911, and in 1913 the school closed. In September 1913, Arlington Training School was founded by H. K. Taylor. The school was beset by financial troubles and lawsuits, ultimately closing after the 1915–16 academic year. In 1916, Arlington Military Academy was founded by John B. Dodson, and it lasted for only one academic year.

From 1917 to 1965, what is now the University of Texas at Arlington was a member of the Texas A&M University System. In March 1917, it was organized as Grubbs Vocational College (GVC), a junior college that was a branch campus of the Agricultural and Mechanical College of Texas (AMC), which later became Texas A&M University. In May 1923, the college was renamed North Texas Agricultural College (NTAC) due to the rapid expansion of its liberal arts curriculum, the fact that it was no longer just a vocational institution, and quickly growing enrollment. In September 1949, the college was renamed Arlington State College (ASC), in part because agriculture was no longer a major course of study. The college ended its agriculture program altogether in 1957. In 1959, Texas governor Price Daniel signed a bill making ASC a four-year college, and ASC awarded its first 23 bachelor's degrees in 1961. ASC announced its racial integration in July 1962 and admitted its first African American students in September. ASC lobbied for separation from A&M, and ultimately, admission into the University of Texas System, which occurred by the act of Texas governor John Connally in 1965.

In March 1967, ASC was renamed the University of Texas at Arlington (UTA). In 1968, UTA awarded its first master's degrees, all in engineering, and in 1969 hired Reby Cary, the first African American administrator at the university. In 1972, Wendell Nedderman was named president of UTA, ultimately serving for 20 years. During his tenure, the university constructed 24 buildings, created 64 new degree programs, and grew from 14,028 students to 25,135. UTA's enrollment declined for seven consecutive years in the 1990s, returning to growth by 1999 and reaching an all-time high of 25,297 students in fall 2004. The UTA campus has grown substantially since 1965, with the addition of numerous new buildings, including College Park Center, the Engineering Research Building, and the Science and Engineering Innovation and Research (SEIR) Building.

== Establishment (1895–1917) ==
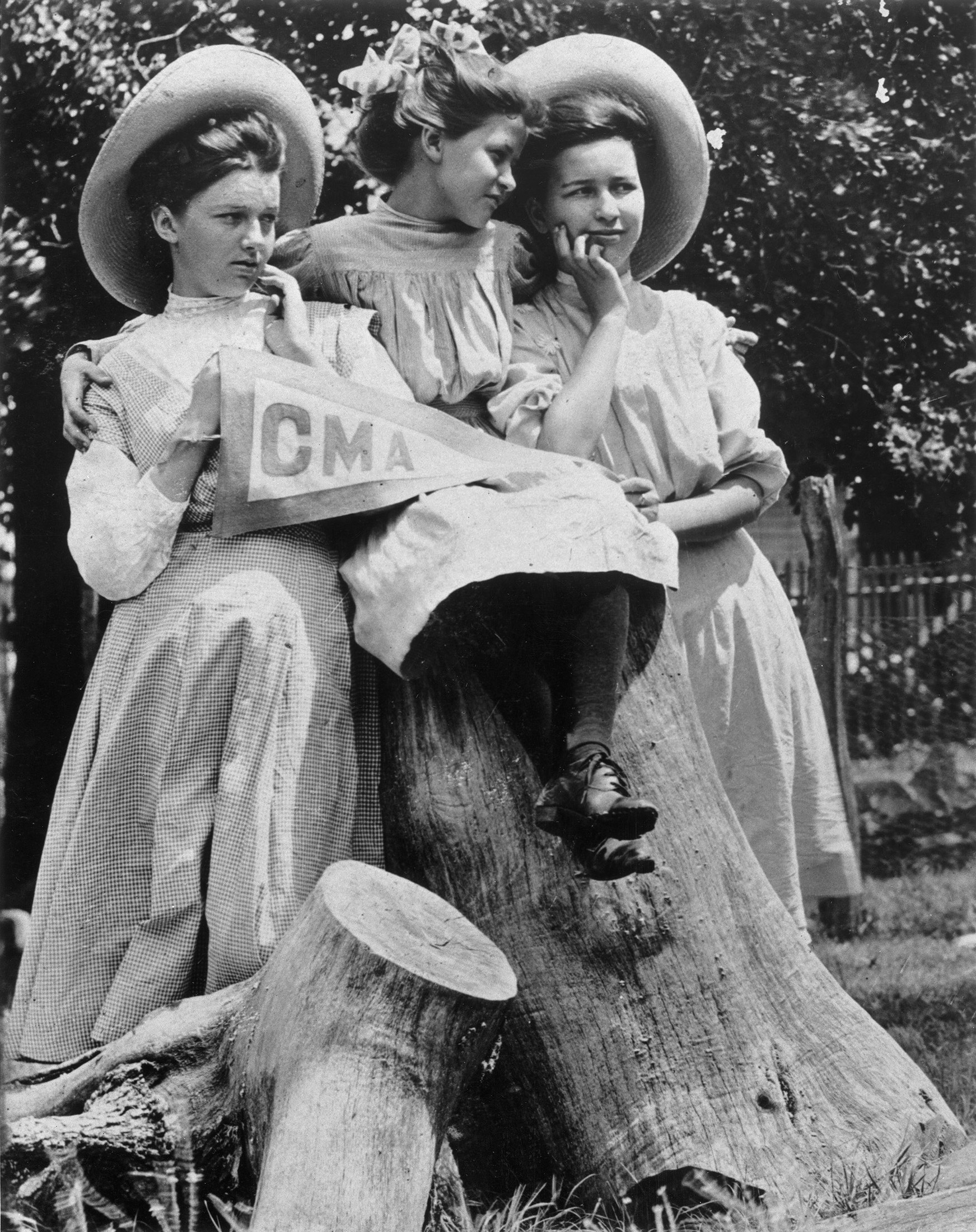
Carlisle Military Academy students Jessie (Bardin) Wardell, Ethel (Roy) Brown, and Eunice Taylor in 1910

The history of the University of Texas at Arlington began with the foundation of Arlington College in 1895, which was the first of a series of private schools to exist on the site of the present university. It consisted of first through tenth grades, enrolled between 75 and 150 students, and was situated on a campus that consisted initially of only a two-story schoolhouse. It was created largely due to the underfunded and generally inadequate public schools in the city. Arlington College closed in July 1902, after Arlington voters passed a proposition to create an independent school district.

Carlisle Military Academy was established on the same site by Colonel James M. Carlisle in 1902. Although nominally a school for boys, it also accepted a handful of female students. Its enrollment grew from 48 students in 1902 to 150 students by 1905. Pupils were between the ages of 10 and 18. The school was molded by Carlisle's educational philosophy, which balanced intellectualism with military training to instill discipline in students and prepare them for enrollment in elite colleges. In 1907, United States Army lieutenant Harry King visited the school and became convinced it was one of the best institutions of its kind in the country. Carlisle's financial problems resulted in the school entering receivership in 1911, and in 1913 the school closed.

In September 1913, Arlington Training School was founded by H. K. Taylor. Like its immediate predecessor, it focused on offering a preparatory military school education for male students, although it also accepted female students. Its enrollment grew from 32 students on its opening day to 93 students in its final academic year, 1915–16. Graduates of its secondary unit met the University of Texas at Austin's entrance requirements. The school was beset by financial troubles and lawsuits in the spring of 1916. Taylor left Arlington after the end of the 1915–16 academic year and Arlington Training School closed.

In 1916, Arlington Military Academy was founded by John B. Dodson, and it lasted for only one academic year. It would be the last attempt by the citizens of Arlington to support a private intermediate and secondary school. Like its predecessors, the school attempted to balance intellectualism with military exercises, instill discipline into its students, and prepare them for attending a university or a career in business. However, its enrollment figures were disappointing, resulting in little community support for the school. In January 1917, Arlington leaders met to organize an effort to convince the Texas Legislature to grant the community a junior college in place of a military academy. Despite their failures, between 1895 and 1917 these four private schools collectively educated hundreds of children in Arlington.

== Texas A&M University System (1917–1965) ==
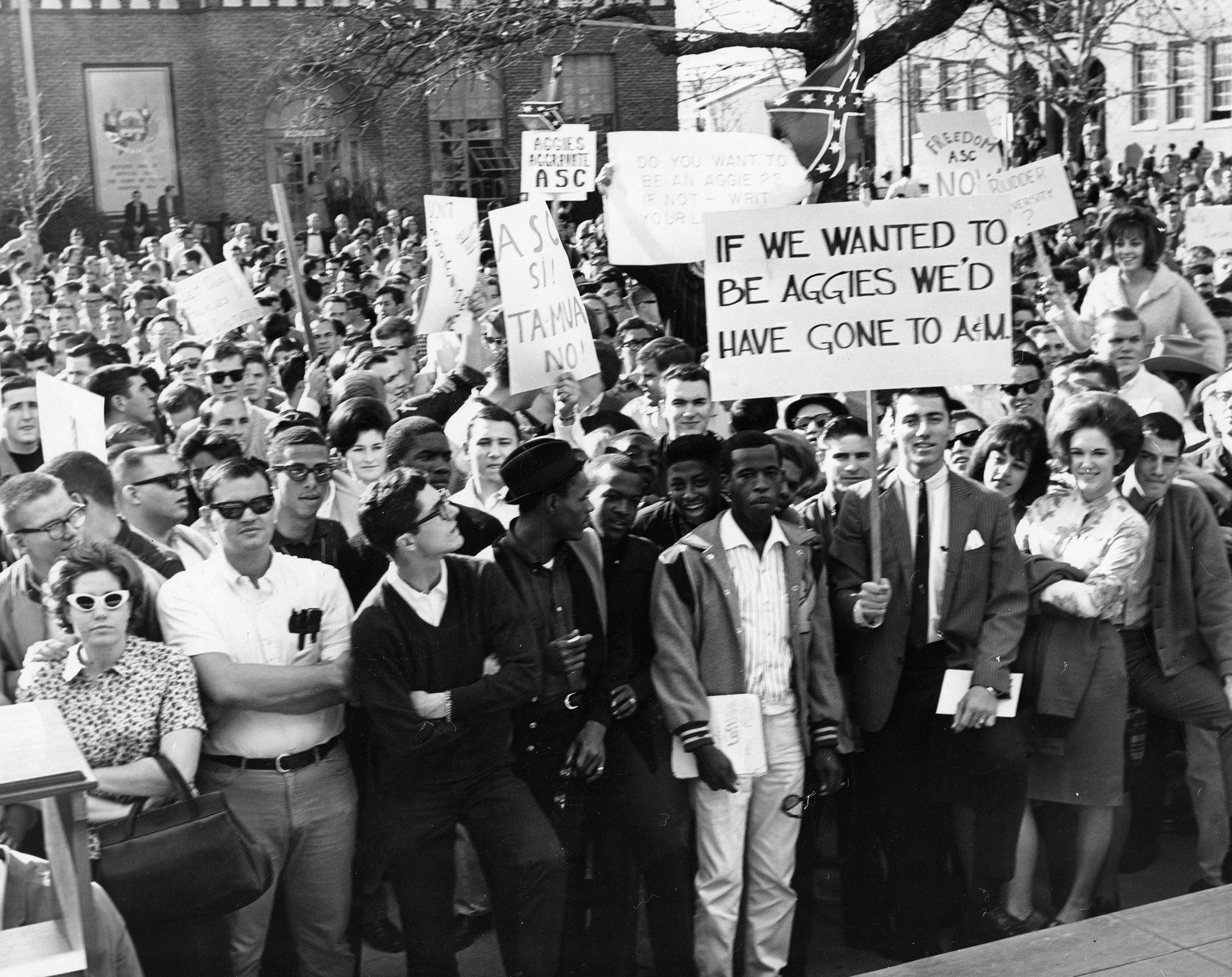
Students at Arlington State College during the Texas A&M controversy, 1965

From 1917 to 1965, what is now the University of Texas at Arlington was a member of the Texas A&M University System. In March 1917, it was organized as Grubbs Vocational College (GVC), a junior college that was a branch campus of the Agricultural and Mechanical College of Texas (AMC), which later became Texas A&M University. Open only to white students, the curriculum at GVC centered around the agricultural, industrial, and mechanical trades.

In May 1923, the college was renamed North Texas Agricultural College (NTAC) due to the rapid expansion of its liberal arts curriculum, the fact that it was no longer just a vocational institution, and quickly growing enrollment. During the Great Depression and World War II, NTAC survived major declines in enrollment and multiple attempts by the state government to close it. Beginning in 1937, there was a movement in Arlington to elevate NTAC to four-year college status, but this goal would not be realized for more than two decades. Student life during the NTAC era was vibrant, although there was a cultural split between the students who lived on campus and those who commuted for classes.

In September 1949, the college was renamed Arlington State College (ASC), in part because agriculture was no longer a major course of study. During the 1950s, it was the largest state junior college in the Southwest, and it grew to be the 5th largest state-supported college or university in Texas by 1959. During the 1950s, enrollment in courses in the arts and sciences, business, and engineering grew substantially. The college ended its agriculture program altogether in 1957. Between 1950 and 1965, ASC conducted a major building campaign that built 18 new buildings on campus at a cost of $14.225 million. On April 27, 1959, Texas governor Price Daniel signed a bill making ASC a four-year college. After the addition of junior-level courses in fall 1959 and senior-level courses in fall 1960, ASC awarded its first 23 bachelor's degrees in 1961.

In response to a legal challenge to its segregationist admissions policy, ASC announced its racial integration in July 1962 and admitted its first African American students in September. ASC experienced growing disillusionment with the Texas A&M University System. ASC supporters believed that Texas A&M subjugated ASC's interests, was too rigid in administrative style, and did not invest adequately in the Arlington college, as it was growing quickly. ASC lobbied for separation from A&M, and ultimately, admission into the University of Texas System, which occurred when Texas governor John Connally signed Senate Bill 401 into law on April 23, 1965. Athletics at ASC were dominated by the football team, which won back-to-back Junior Rose Bowls in 1956 and 1957, bringing the college national recognition for the first time. ASC also created a men's swimming program during the mid-1960s that featured Doug Russell, a collegiate national champion who would go on to win a gold medal at the 1968 Summer Olympics.

== University of Texas System (1965–present) ==
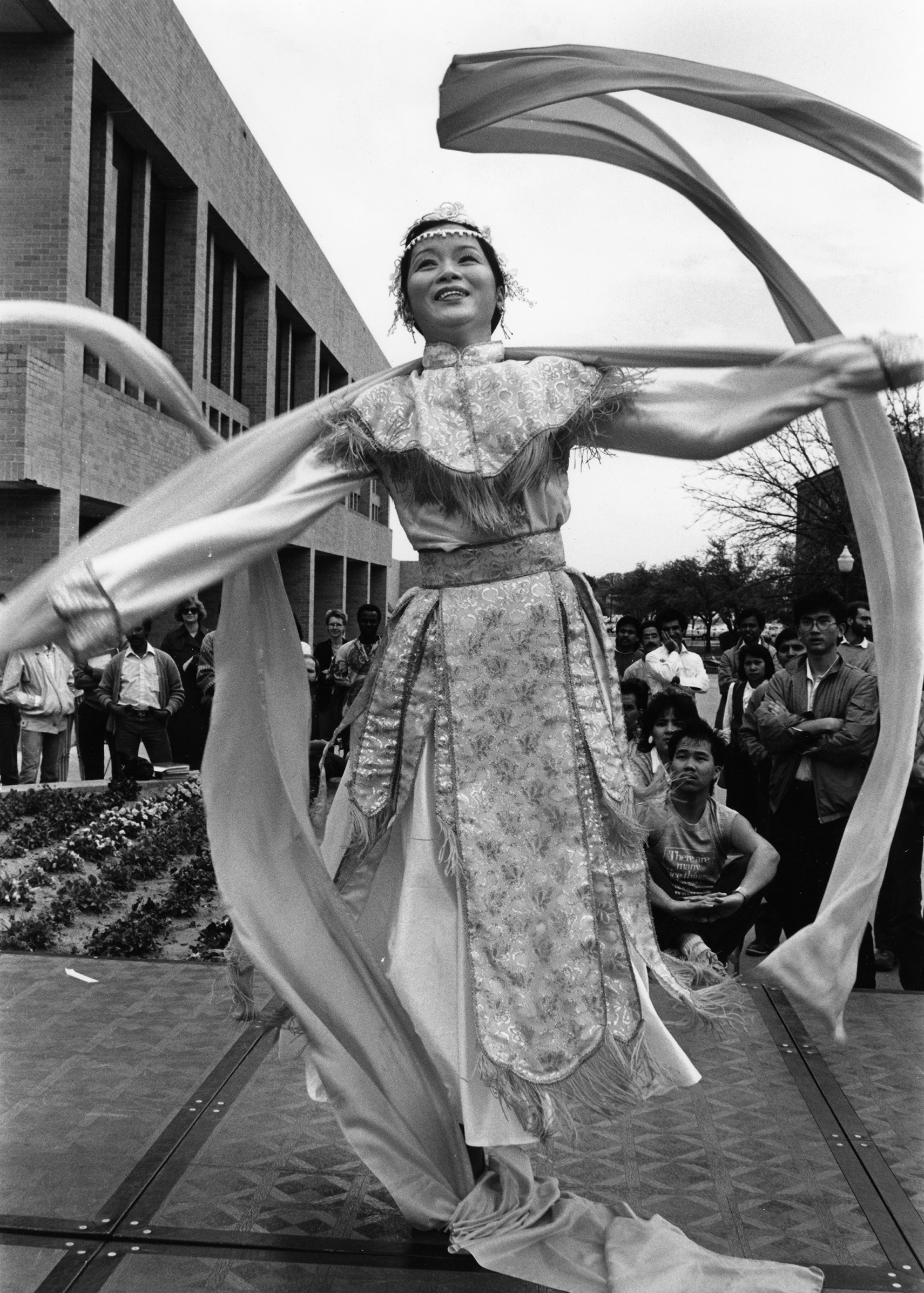
A dancer in costume during UTA's International Week, 1987

In April 1965, the Texas Legislature transferred Arlington State College (ASC) from the Texas A&M University System to the University of Texas System (UT System). In 1966, Maxwell Scarlett became the first African American graduate in ASC's history. In March 1967, ASC was renamed the University of Texas at Arlington (UTA). Jack Woolf, who had served as president of ASC and then UTA since 1959, resigned the presidency in 1968 and was succeeded by Frank Harrison, who would serve as president until 1972. Also in 1968, UTA awarded its first master's degrees, all in engineering. In 1969, UTA hired Reby Cary, the first African American administrator at the university.

In 1972, Harrison resigned and Wendell Nedderman was named his successor, ultimately serving as president for 20 years. During his tenure, the university constructed 24 buildings, created 64 new degree programs, and grew from 14,028 students to 25,135. From the start of the Nedderman administration to the end, UTA's student demographics changed substantially: the ratio of male-to-female students shifted from approximately 2:1 to nearly 1:1 while African Americans went from 2.6% to 7.2% of the student body, Hispanic students went from 1.9% to 6.3%, and Asian and Pacific Islander students went from less than 1% to 8.5%. By the mid-1970s, UTA had also become one of the most accessible universities in Texas for disabled students.

In April 1992, Nedderman was succeeded as university president by Ryan C. Amacher. Focused on actively recruiting minority students and employees to UTA as well as marketing the university aggressively, Amacher and his administration polarized the campus before his sudden resignation in March 1995 in the face of charges that he showed budgetary favoritism to athletics and spent too much on non-essential costs at the expense of academic programs. He was replaced by University of Texas at Austin dean Robert Witt, as UTA's enrollment continued to decline for seven consecutive years in the 1990s. UTA returned to growing enrollment by 1999, reaching an all-time high of 25,297 students in fall 2004. In November 2003, Michigan State University dean James D. Spaniolo was named UTA president. In 2013, he was succeeded by Vistasp Karbhari, who served as president until resigning in 2020 in the face of a lawsuit by a former vice president and the release of an audit report.

The UTA campus has grown substantially since 1965, with the addition of numerous new buildings, including College Park Center, the Engineering Research Building, and the Science and Engineering Innovation and Research (SEIR) Building. Student traditions have also developed considerably over the same span of time, with examples being bed racing, oozeball, and International Week. Among the most notable athletics events of the UTA era were the termination of the university's football program in 1985, the women's volleyball team advancing to the Final Four in the 1989 NCAA Division I women's volleyball tournament, and the Movin' Mavs and Lady Movin' Mavs wheelchair basketball teams winning nine and two national championships, respectively.

== Sources ==
- Saxon, Gerald D. (1995). Transitions: A Centennial History of the University of Texas at Arlington, 1895–1995. Arlington, Texas: UTA Press. ISBN 0932408192.
- Barker, Evelyn; Worcester, Lea (2015). University of Texas at Arlington. Charleston, South Carolina: Arcadia Publishing. ISBN 9781439649732.
