= UTA Aerodynamics Research Center =

The University of Texas at Arlington Aerodynamics Research Center (ARC) is a facility located in the southeast portion of the campus operated under the Department of Mechanical and Aerospace Engineering. It was established in 1986 as part of an expansion of UTA's College of Engineering. The ARC contributes to the vision of UTA and the University of Texas System to transform the university into a full-fledged research institution. It showcases the aerodynamics research activities at UTA and, in its history, has established itself as a unique facility at a university level. The wind tunnels and equipment in the facility were mainly built by scouting for and upgrading decommissioned equipment from the government and industry. Currently, Masters and Ph.D. students perform research in the fields of high-speed gas dynamics, propulsion (including Pulse detonation engines), and Computational fluid dynamics among other projects related to aerodynamics.

== History ==
The development of the ARC began in 1975 as an effort to develop a shock tube for experimental research in magnetohydrodynamic (MHD) power generation. At the same time, the engineering accreditation board recommended that the Aerospace Engineering Department (which has since merged back into the Department of Mechanical and Aerospace Engineering) should have a high speed wind tunnel capability. An arc heater was shipped to UTA but was put in storage because of a lack of funds to acquire the support equipment necessary for its operation. In 1976, two professors visited both the AEDC and NASA's Marshall Space Flight Center in Huntsville, Alabama, to view their transonic Ludwieg tube facilities. The idea was the build a smaller version of the wind tunnel at UTA, but when the AEDC facility was toured it was found that its Ludwieg tube had recently been decommissioned. The Ludwieg tube had been developed as a prototype for the Air Force concept for the National Transonic Facility Development Program, but the decision had recently been made to build the NTF at the NASA Langley Research Center using their cryogenic tunnel concept. The professors jokingly told the AEDC project manager to consider donating the tube to UTA, which was taken as a serious offer. The Ludwieg tube was declared government surplus and donated to UTA, showing up at the rail head in Arlington, Texas on three flat bed cars.

Possession of the Ludwieg tube facility attracted lucrative grants, which became a logistical problem because UTA was then involved in a major building program that included the renovation of an engineering building that the tunnel was scheduled to go into. This would have meant a period of several years of storage and hundreds of thousands of dollars of lost grants. The solution to this problem was the construction of a temporary facility on the first floor of a newly built engineering building. This facility happened to be located underneath the office of the Dean of the College of Engineering, who promptly changed the temporary facility to a permanent building upon hearing how loud the Luwieg tube was. Once the concept of a permanent building was proposed, several new wind tunnels and equipment were added. In 1985, a large compressor located at NASA Ames Research Center became available and was donated to UTA. This 5-stage Clark compressor was rated at 3000 psi, 2000 cfm, and was driven by a 1250 hp motor. The total power consumption during full load operation is over 1.6 MW. Moving the compressor to a new building with its associated equipment cost nearly $500,000.00. The entire building was built around the compressor in 1986, and continued development has occurred since that time which includes the construction of supersonic and hypersonic facilities.

== Low-Speed Wind Tunnel Laboratory ==
The low-speed wind tunnel is a closed-circuit, continuous flow tunnel with a 100 hp, variable frequency drive. The test section measures 0.6 by 0.9 meters and is capable of flow velocities up to 50 m/s. It is equipped with 3 and 6 component force balances and a PC-based multiplexed data acquisition system. Smoke visualization is also available. An auxiliary high pressure air supply enables the tunnel to be used for jet and surface blowing studies.

== High Reynolds Number Transonic Ludwieg Tube Wind Tunnel ==
The high Reynolds number transonic Ludwieg tube wind tunnel has a porous wall test section that measures 19.5 by 23.2 cm (9 in). It is an impulse facility with a run time of about 120 ms. The Mach number range is 0.5–1.2 and the Reynolds number range is 4–40 million/meter. The extremely high Reynolds number capability enables full-scale simulation of rotor aerodynamics. The tunnel has a low level of turbulence, with free stream pressure fluctuations of only 1 percent rms. It possesses a 5 component balance.

== Supersonic Wind Tunnel ==
The supersonic wind tunnel is a blowdown type tunnel equipped with a variable Mach number nozzle. The wind tunnel was developed in-house except for the donation of a nozzle by LTV (presently Lockheed Martin Missile and Fire Control). The current achievable Mach number range is 1.5 to 4.0 with Reynolds numbers between 60 and 140 million per meter. The test section cross section area is 6 by 6.5 inches. The maximum upstream storage tank volume is 24.5 cubic meters at 700 psig.

== Hypersonic Shock Tunnel ==
The hypersonic shock tunnel is another impulse facility with a run time of 0.5 to 5.0 ms. The tunnel has a test section of 0.44 meters (diameter) by a length of 1 meter. The inviscid core is 0.17 m at Mach 8. It is capable of testing at Mach numbers from 5 to 16 and Reynolds numbers from 100 to 20 million per meter. The tunnel can be modified to accommodate a detonation driver using a mixture of hydrogen, oxygen and helium. This was completed in 1991, and led to a $1,000,000 grant to form the NASA/UTA Center for Hypersonic Research between 1993 and 1998.

== Arc Heated Tunnel ==
The key component of the arc heated wind tunnel is a 2 MW DC electric arc heater. The test section is 10.3 cm (4 in) with a 91.4 cm (36 in) length. It is used to produce supersonic streams of extremely hot gas. The gas flowing through the arc heater is heated by a powerful electric arc to produce a gas stream with bulk temperatures ranging from 3000 to 5000 K. The facility is based on a Thermal Dynamics F-5000 arc heater, donated from the USAF Arnold Engineering Development Center. Additionally, the facility also consists of systems for nitrogen injection, water cooling, creating a vacuum and a transversing probe as well as facility monitoring and protection.

The bulk total enthalpy output ranges from 4000 to 5800 kJ/kg, which is controlled by adjustments in the power supply output of current and the rate that gas is injected into the arc heater. The arc heater can be configured to produce a very peaked enthalpy distribution across the nozzle exit, which can give local total enthalpies roughly twice the bulk average level. Facility operations have demonstrated mass flow rates from 0.07–0.18 kg/s. The corresponding maximum run duration is 90–200 s. The maximum operating pressure for the arc heater is 20 atmospheres. A compressed air driven ejector pump provides vacuum conditions in the test section vessel during test runs. The ejector pump has produced test section pressures as low as 4.5 kPa (0.65 psia) without the arc heater running. A mechanical vacuum pump is available to provide a high initial vacuum in the facility's 4.25 cubic meter vacuum tank. The vacuum capability of the facility enables the use of high expansion ratio nozzles with the arc heater. A programmable, 3-axis traverse system allows probe surveys to be performed within a space of 20 cm (8 in) wide, 23 cm (9 in) long and 30 cm (12 in) deep (8 x 9 x 12 inches). This system can be used to mount models or test articles as well.

== Faculty ==
- Luca Maddalena, Ph.D. – director
- Frank K. Lu, Ph.D., P.E. – former director
- Donald R. Wilson, Ph.D., P.E. – former director, 1986–1993

== See also ==
- Aerodynamics
- Nedderman Hall
- Pulse detonation engine
- University of Texas at Arlington
- University of Texas at Arlington College of Engineering
- Wind tunnel
