= Nedderman Hall =

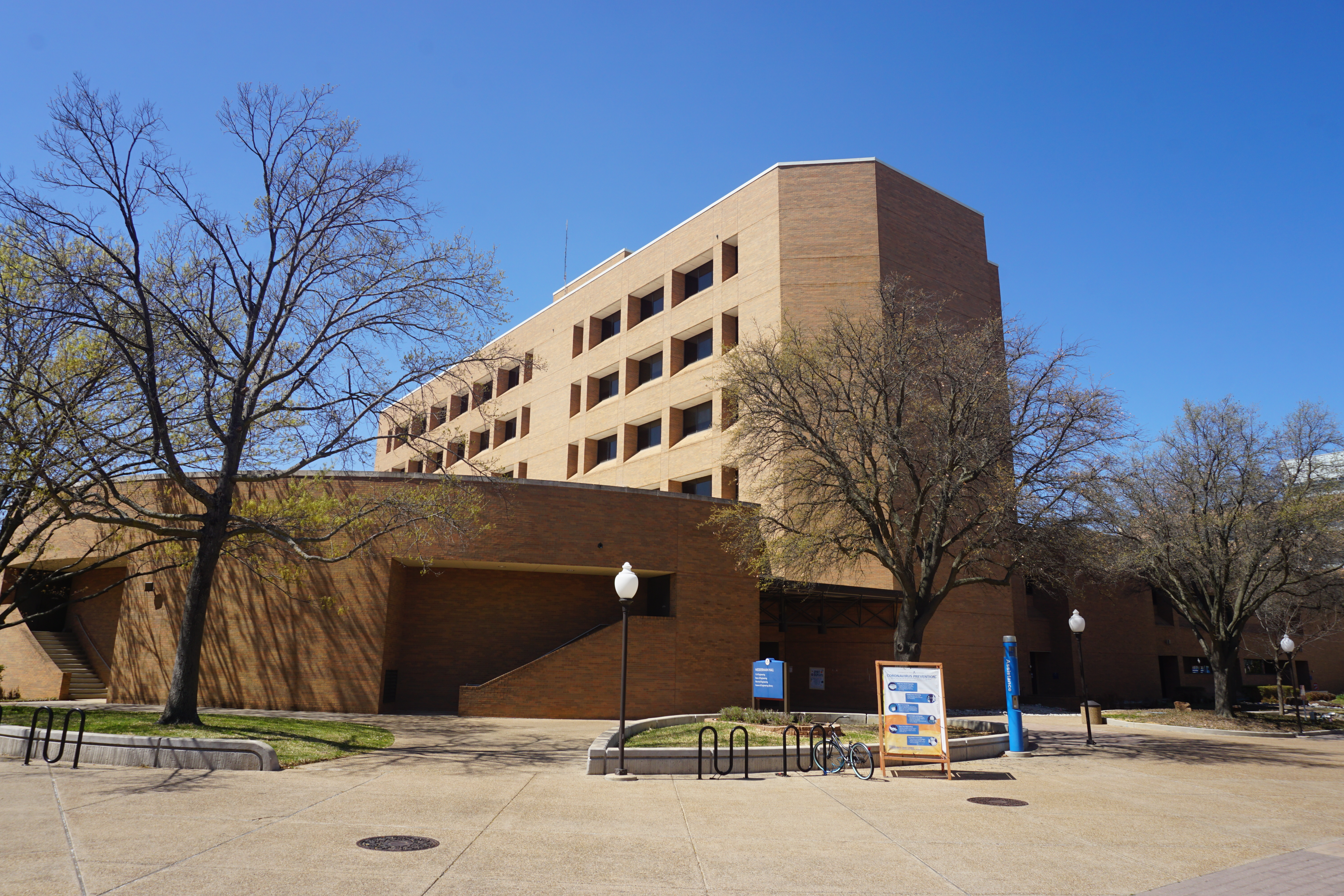
- Nedderman Hall in 2021
- Interactive map of the Nedderman Hall area

General information
- Location: 416 S. Yates St., Arlington, TX 76010
- Coordinates: 32°43.95′N 97°6.83′W
- Named for: Wendell Nedderman
- Opened: 1988; 38 years ago
- Affiliation: University of Texas at Arlington

Technical details
- Floor count: 7 (including basement level)
- Lifts/elevators: 4

Nedderman Hall (abbreviated NH) is an academic engineering building located on the University of Texas at Arlington campus. The building houses the Civil Engineering and Electrical Engineering departments, lecture halls, research labs, the offices of the Dean of the College of Engineering, and a Science and Engineering library.

It is named after Wendell Nedderman, Ph.D., P.E., civil engineering professor emeritus as well as former UT Arlington Dean of Engineering (1959–1969) and President (1972–1992).

== History ==
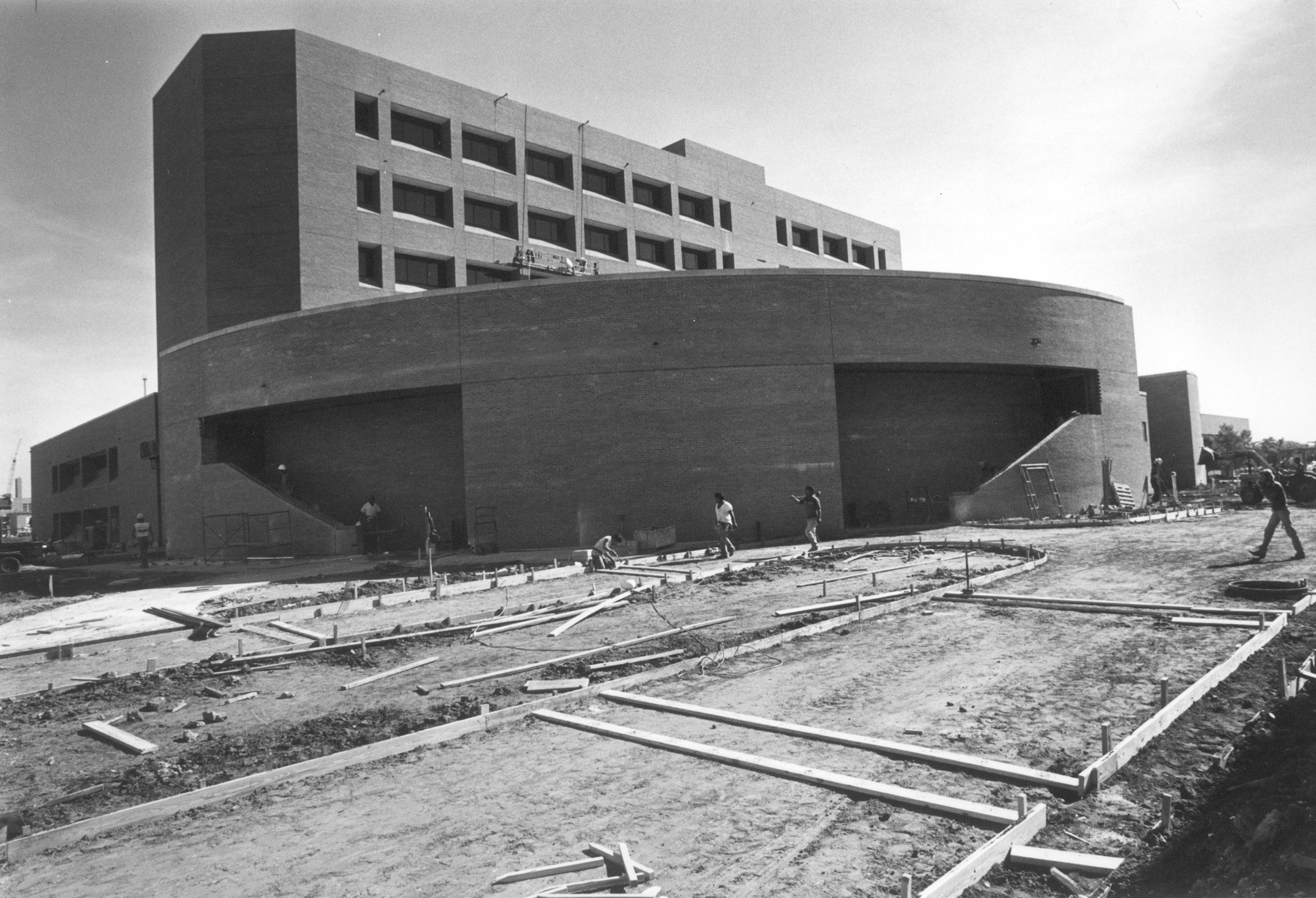
Nedderman Hall under construction

Labeled the "New Engineering Building" in 1988 university maps, the newly renamed "Engineering Building II" was dedicated on October 8, 1988. In 1991, the University renamed the building after Dr. Nedderman.

== Hall of Flags ==
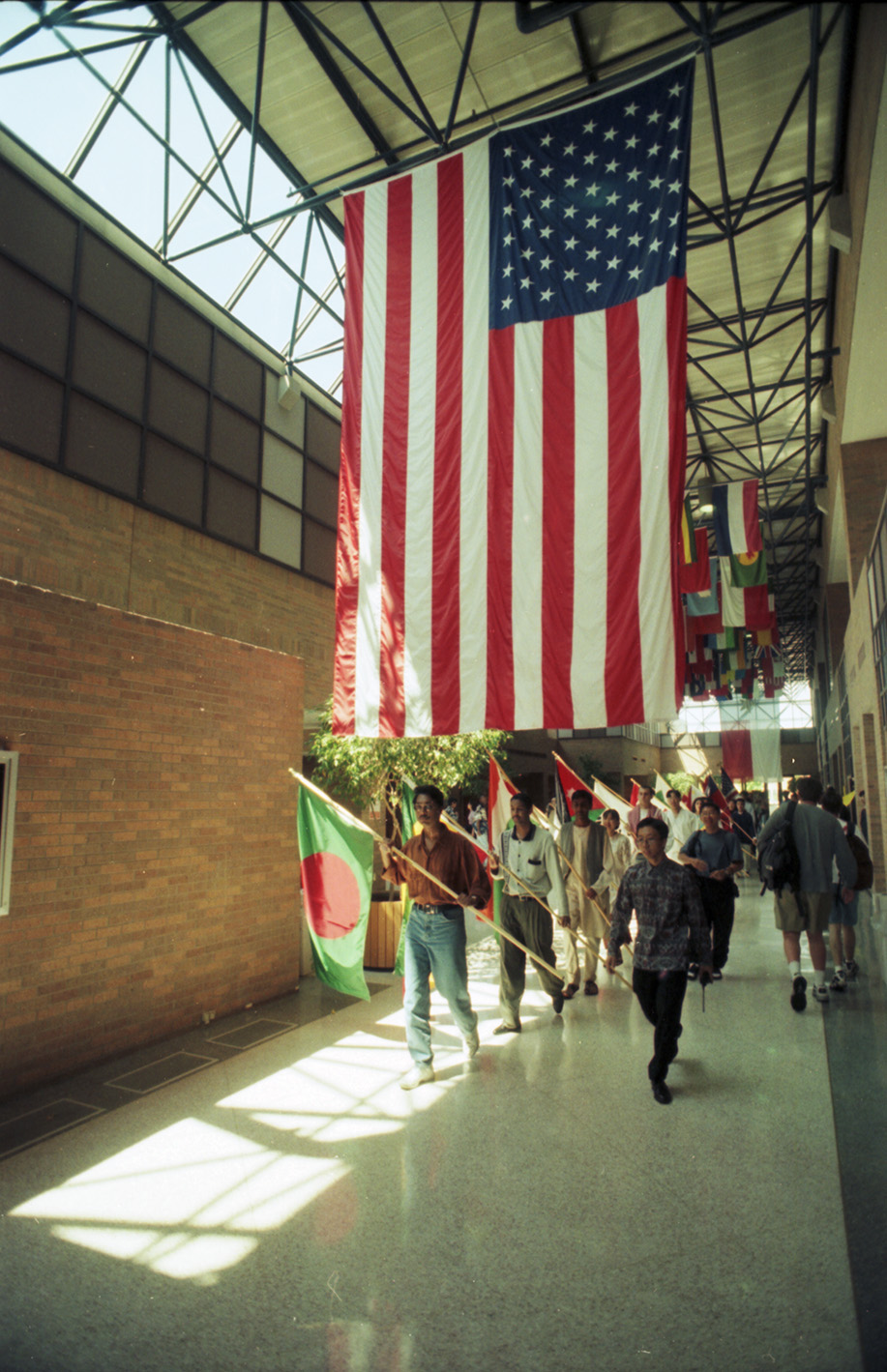
UTA Hall of Flags ceremony, 1997

Shortly after the building opened, the College installed the Hall of Flags. Every student who had ever attended the College of Engineering had his country's flag on display. A matrix of 123 flags, with the Texas Lone Star flag, at west end, and the USA flag on the east end, suspended 50 feet above the ground, the Hall of Flags was an imposing sight.

=== Flags controversy ===
In April 2006, some Vietnamese Americans objected to the hanging of the national flag of Vietnam. The flag of the former South Vietnam had been hanging in the Hall of Flags since its beginning. The national flag of North Vietnam has long been associated with the current communist state in Vietnam. On April 28, university President James D. Spaniolo stated in an editorial in the student newspaper, the Shorthorn, that the University's official stance on the flags was:

"By displaying these flags, the University is not endorsing these nations or their politics or policies; we are supporting the UT Arlington students and alumni who come from these nations. The flags represent students’ countries of origin, not governments."

On April 30, 2006, over 3,000 Vietnamese Americans around the state came to the campus to protest the hanging of the flag.

On May 10, 2006, UTA President James Spaniolo ordered the removal of all 123 flags from the Hall of Flags until a committee can be formed "to explore alternative means to celebrate the diversity of our student body."

The flags have now been replaced by UT Arlington banners.

== WiFi connectivity ==
Nedderman Hall is covered by the UTA wireless network that provides 802.11n access to students, faculty, and staff. Guest access is available, but is limited to access to pages hosted on the UTA domain. Full access can be granted to guests with a faculty or staff sponsor through the Office of Information Technology.

== Departments ==
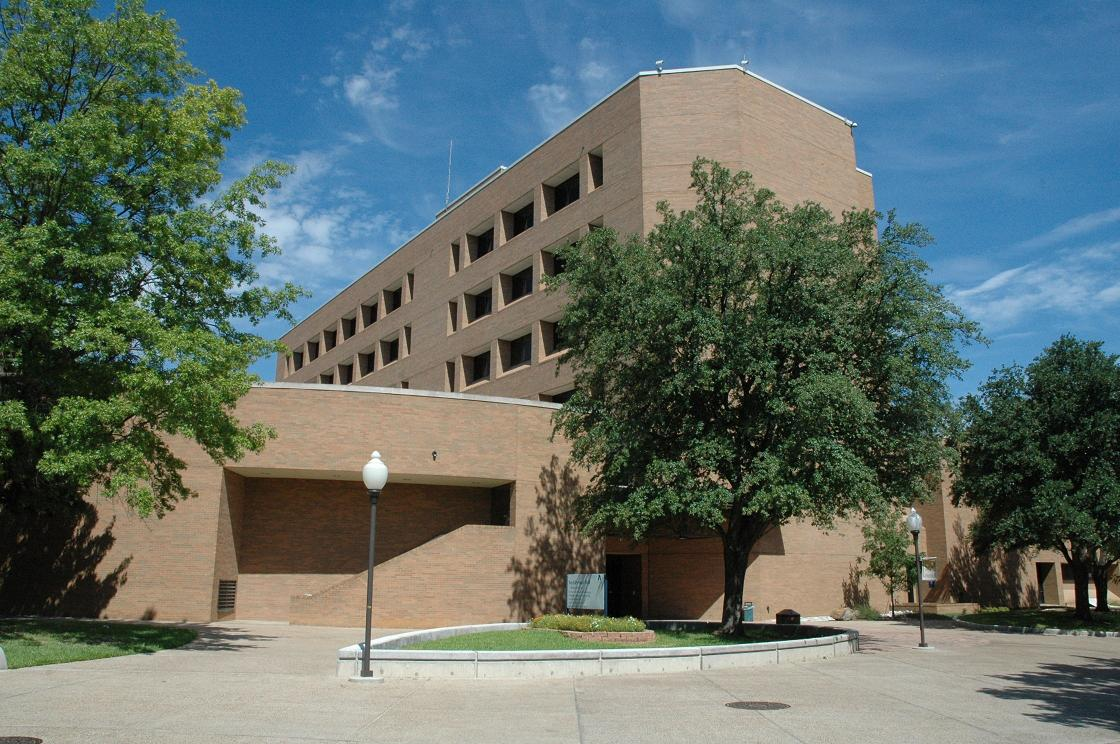
Nedderman Hall in 2010

Nedderman Hall houses two of the nine engineering departments at UTA, and some of their respective labs. The departments housed in Nedderman Hall are:

- Electrical Engineering
- Civil & Environmental Engineering

In addition, the top floor of the building houses the offices of the Dean of the College of Engineering as well as the office of W. H. Nedderman, an engineering professor and former president of UTA for whom the building is named. The second floor houses the College of Engineering Engineering Student Services.

The other engineering departments at UTA are housed in Woolf Hall, the Engineering Lab Building, the Engineering Research Building, and the NanoFab Research & Teaching Facility.

== Organizations ==
Nedderman Hall houses 13 of the 21 engineering student organizations at UTA:

- Association for Computing Machinery
- Alpha Sigma Kappa - Women in Technical Studies
- American Society of Civil Engineers
- Chi Epsilon - Civil Engineering Honor Society
- Eta Kappa Nu - Electrical and Computer Engineering Honor Society
- IEEE
- Institute of Transportation Engineers
- Joint Council of Engineering Organizations
- National Society of Black Engineers
- Society of Hispanic Professional Engineers
- Society of Women Engineers
- Tau Beta Pi - Engineering Honor Society
- Upsilon Pi Epsilon - International Honor Society for the Computing and Information Disciplines

== Science & Engineering Library ==
UT Arlington's Science & Engineering library is located in the basement of the building and provides extensive resources to the students. This library, like the other four libraries on the UTA campus, is open to the public for research and extends borrowing and other privileges to many non-UTA-affiliated individuals through the TexShare program.

== Center for Distance Education ==
As of June 1, 2011, part of the third floor of Nedderman Hall is now home to UT Arlington's Center for Distance Education.
