= Jennifer Cowley =

American urban planner

10th President of the University of Texas at Arlington
- In office April 28, 2022 – August 31, 2026
- Preceded by: Teik Lim (interim); Vistasp Karbhari

Personal details
- Born: October 1974 (age 52)
- Spouse: Jon Cowley
- Education: Texas A&M University (BS, MUP, PhD); University of North Texas (MPA, MS)
- Profession: College administrator, Urban Planning
- Website: https://www.uta.edu/president/

Jennifer Evans-Cowley is an American urban planner and academic, specialising in public engagement and technology infrastructure. In January 2022, she was named by the UT System Board of Regents as the 10th president of The University of Texas at Arlington beginning April 28, 2022, making her the first woman to hold the office. She announced her resignation as president on August 31, 2026, writing that she planned to return to teaching and research as a professor of planning and public affairs in the College of Architecture, Planning, and Public Affairs.

== Early life and education ==
Cowley grew up in Arlington, Texas. She graduated from Arlington’s James Martin High School, where she was active in the school orchestra and academic decathlon. She earned a bachelor’s degree in political science, a master’s degree in urban planning, and a PhD in urban and regional science, all from Texas A&M University. She also holds two master’s degrees from the University of North Texas, one in public administration (1997) and one in interdisciplinary studies (2020). While in college she was active in student radio and orchestra.

== Career ==
Cowley began her professional career in 1995 as a planning assistant for the city of College Station, Texas, and then joined the city of Amarillo, Texas, as a planner in 1997.

Her career in higher education began at Texas A&M University, where she served as a research scientist at the university’s Real Estate Center and a visiting assistant professor of urban and regional planning. Cowley joined Ohio State University in 2001 as an assistant professor of city and regional planning and held numerous leadership roles over the course of 16 years there, including as head of city and regional planning, and associate dean for academic affairs and administration in the College of Engineering. Cowley became acting vice provost (faculty fellow) in 2013 and in 2014 was promoted to vice provost for capital planning and regional campuses in the Office of Academic Affairs.

In 2017, Cowley joined the University of North Texas as provost and vice president of academic affairs, a position she held until joining UTA in 2022. Throughout her nearly five years at UNT, she developed an R1 Our Way Action Plan, a roadmap meant to drive forward the university’s goal to move up the ranks of Carnegie R1 universities. She also co-designed an initiative around celebrating the university’s 2020 designation as a Hispanic-Serving Institution.

Cowley has authored more than 100 articles, technical reports, book chapters and books. Cowley has received research grants and contracts from the U.S. Department of Housing and Urban Development, U.S. Environmental Protection Agency, the National Endowment for the Arts and other groups. In 2020, she was named a fellow of the American Institute of Certified Planners. In 2022, Cowley was elected a fellow of National Academy of Public Administration.

== Awards and honors ==
- 2020 – Fellow, American Institute of Certified Planners, American Planning Association
- 2016 – Short Format Program - Informational Regional Emmy, Ohio Valley Chapter of the National Academy of Television Arts and Sciences for “Surviving an Active Shooter”
- 2014 – Outstanding Alumni Award, College of Architecture, Texas A&M University
- 2014 – University Distinguished Diversity Enhancement Award, Ohio State University
- 2006 – Prize for Excellence in Teaching Practice, Association of European Schools of Planning
