= Jack Woolf =

Jack R. Woolf
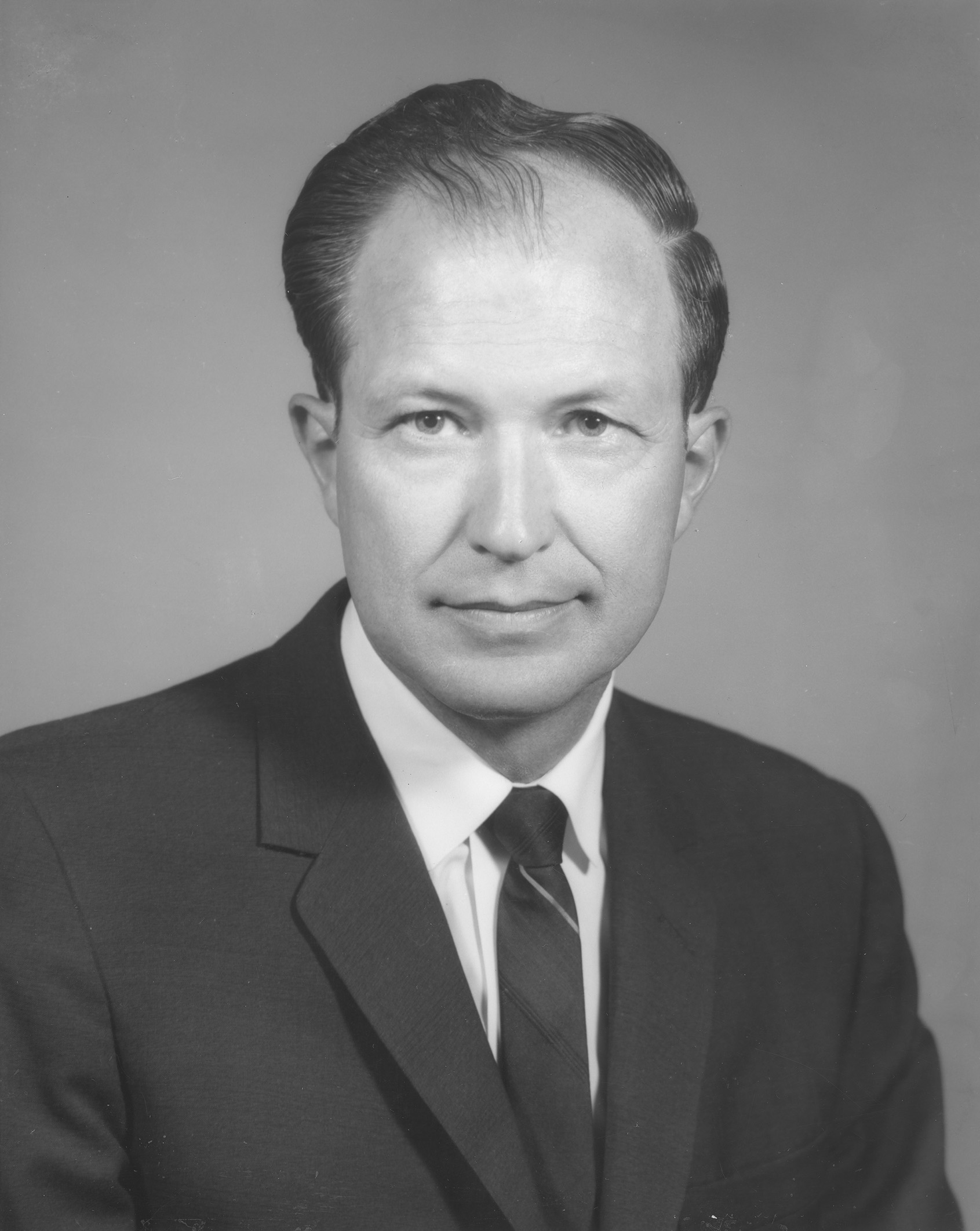

2nd President of the University of Texas at Arlington
- Preceded by: Ernest H. Hereford
- Succeeded by: Wendell Nedderman

Personal details
- Born: 10 June 1924 Trinidad, Texas, US
- Died: 10 June 2014 (aged 90) Arlington, Texas, US
- Education: Texas A&M University; Purdue University
- Known for: President, University of Texas at Arlington, Woolf Hall, University of Texas at Arlington; Distinguished Alumnus, College of Engineering, Purdue University; Academy of Distinguished Graduates of Mechanical Engineering, Texas A&M University

Jack Royce Woolf (June 10, 1924 – June 10, 2014) was an American academic who arrived at Arlington State College in 1957 as dean of the college. After one year as dean, the Texas A&M Board appointed him acting president in 1958 and president in 1959. In 1967, upon the university leaving the Texas A&M System for the University of Texas System and with the accompanying name change, Woolf became president of The University of Texas at Arlington. Woolf resigned the presidency in 1968, but continued service to the university until 1989.

== Early life and education ==
Jack Royce Woolf was born to Jeff D. and Emily Mahaza (Bradley) Woolf on June 10, 1924, in Trinidad, Texas. His grandmother Woolf's family settled in the Trinidad, Texas, area after the Civil War.

After graduating from Trinidad High School, Woolf enrolled in Texas A&M College in 1941, but left A&M in 1943 to enter active duty in the US Army. He was commissioned an officer in the United States Army Air Corps and served for three and one-half years. During his service, he commanded an aviation engineering company that built air strips in the Philippines. After Army service, he re-entered Texas A&M and in 1948 earned B.S. and M.S. degrees in mechanical engineering. On July 10, 1948, he married Martha Lee Frazar of Strawn, Texas. They moved to Indiana, where Woolf was an instructor and graduate student at Purdue University. He received a Ph.D. in mechanical engineering on June 10, 1951.

== Career ==
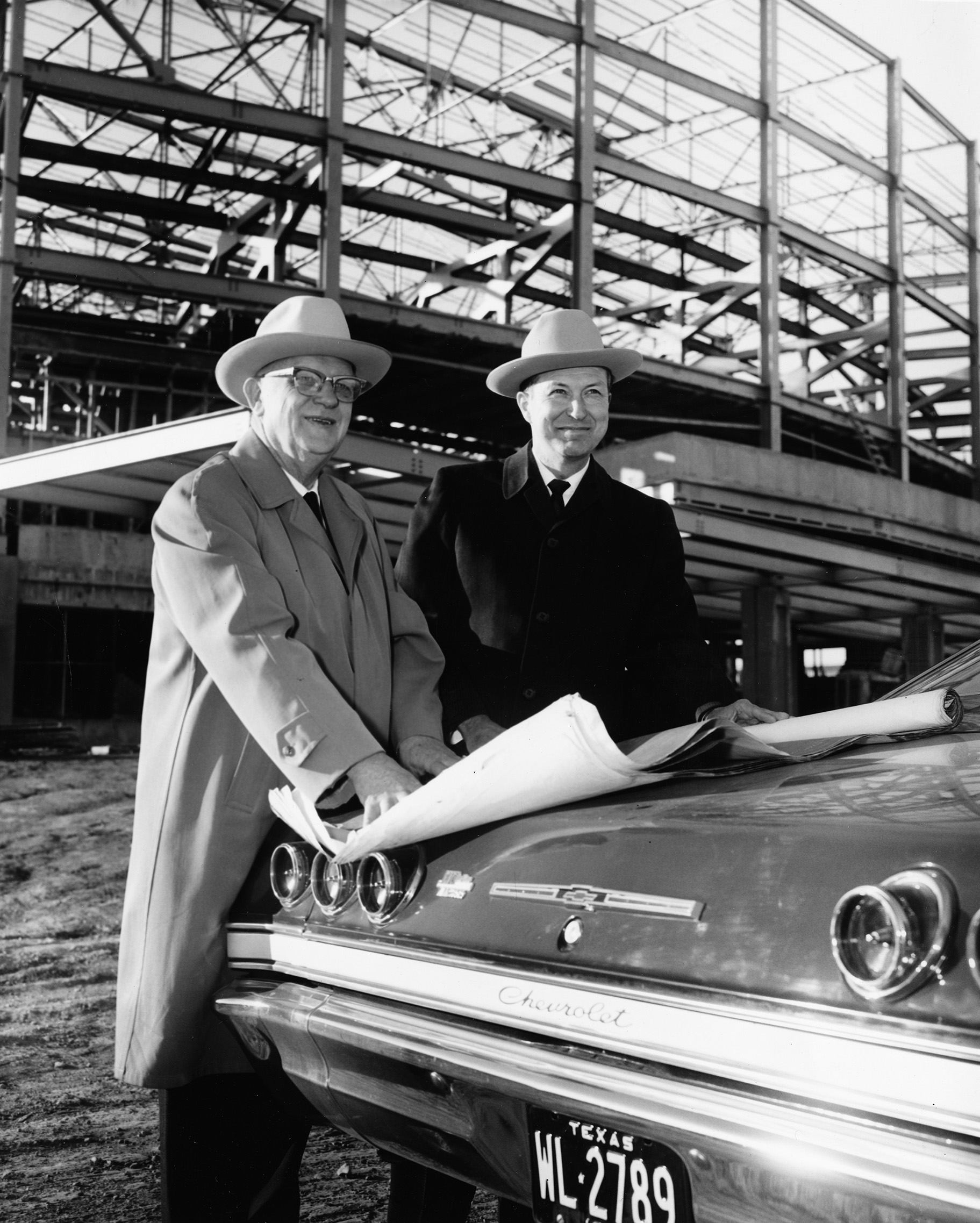
Jack Woolf with B.C. Barnes reviewing architect's plans at the Texas Hall construction site

Upon graduation from Purdue, Woolf accepted a position as a research engineer and supervisor of propulsion research and a team member on the B-58 project with Convair (now Lockheed Martin) in Fort Worth, Texas.

In 1956, he joined Texas A&M in College Station, Texas, as a professor in mechanical engineering and assistant dean of engineering. In 1957, he joined Arlington State College (ASC) as its dean. Soon after ASC president Hereford's death in November 1958, the Texas A&M Board appointed him acting president and in 1959, as president. On March 13, 1967, ASC officially became The University of Texas at Arlington. At that point, Woolf became UT Arlington president, a post he resigned from in 1968.

During Woolf's tenure as president, Arlington State College was elevated to a four-year institution effective September 1, 1959. The college was authorized to offer seventeen bachelor's degree programs in business administration, engineering, liberal arts, and the sciences. At this time, Woolf recruited Wendell Nedderman as the first dean of engineering. By 1966, three more bachelors were added as well as teacher certification programs in seven academic departments.

In 1966, in a historic move, Woolf established the graduate school with approval for six new master's degree programs: electrical engineering, engineering mechanics, mathematics, economics, physics, and psychology. The university's first doctoral program, a Ph.D. in engineering, was to come on September 1, 1969.

Under Woolf's leadership, ASC was the first Texas A&M System school to integrate (1962) and the first to accept black athletes (1963). Under his presidency, ASC/UTA expanded rapidly from an enrollment of 5,000 to 11,500. He instituted the first bachelor's and master's degree programs.

== Opposition to Integration ==
ASC, under Woolf's leadership, maintained the system of segregation despite the Supreme Court decisions of Sweatt v. Painter and Brown v. Board of Education. This system would involve the Registrar sending a letter to any black applicants that due to "present regulations" they were unable to admit the students to the college, instead forwarding their transcripts to Prairie View A&M which was the HBCU of the A&M system. It is known that Ernest Hooper, Herbert White, Leaston Chase, Jerry Hanes, Jesse Oliver, and Willie Willis had all sent in applications around April 1962, and were all subsequently denied. Ernest Hooper, Leaston Chase, and Jerry Hanes approached the Dallas chapter of the National Association for the Advancement of Colored Peoples for assistance. The Legal Redress Committee, chaired by Dallas lawyer Fred J. Finch, Jr., took on their case - with Fred Finch, Jr. writing a letter to Woolf on May 25, 1962, to admit his clients which would essentially integrate the college.

On June 29 the board of directors for the A&M System agreed in an internal meeting to allow the college to integrate, with Chancellor Harrington and President Woolf to conduct a press conference regarding the integration on July 10, 1962. Woolf announced that "...this would be total, not a token integration" as reported by Arlington Journal on July 12, 1962. However, Woolf would not desegregate the faculty and staff, being quoted in Fort Worth Star-Telegram, on July 11, 1962, as saying "ASC has no plans now or in the future to hire (Black) teachers". Reby Cary, U.T.A.'s first black faculty, would be hired in September 1969 after Woolf had resigned.

In a personal letter to Chancellor Harrington asking for guidance from the Board, Woolf cautioned problems with the federal government over housing and dormitories given they were all federally funded which seems to indicate that there were attempts to instill segregated housing. In this same letter he notified Harrington that the Athletic Council of the college was positive towards integration, likewise seeking the Board's guidance on the matter. The athletic team would be desegregated in 1963, although the dormitories would not be integrated for another two years. Despite all 61 registered student organizations being integrated "in policy", only 14 of them were integrated "in fact" according to a 1965 Civil Rights Review as done by Dean of Men Horace F. Gillespie and Dean of Students Robert J. Dollar.

The integration of ASC was relatively peaceful as compared to other schools, like Mansfield, but the Rebel and Old South theme would eventually find controversy among the new black students that eventually lead to its replacement by the Mavericks in 1971.

== Retirement ==
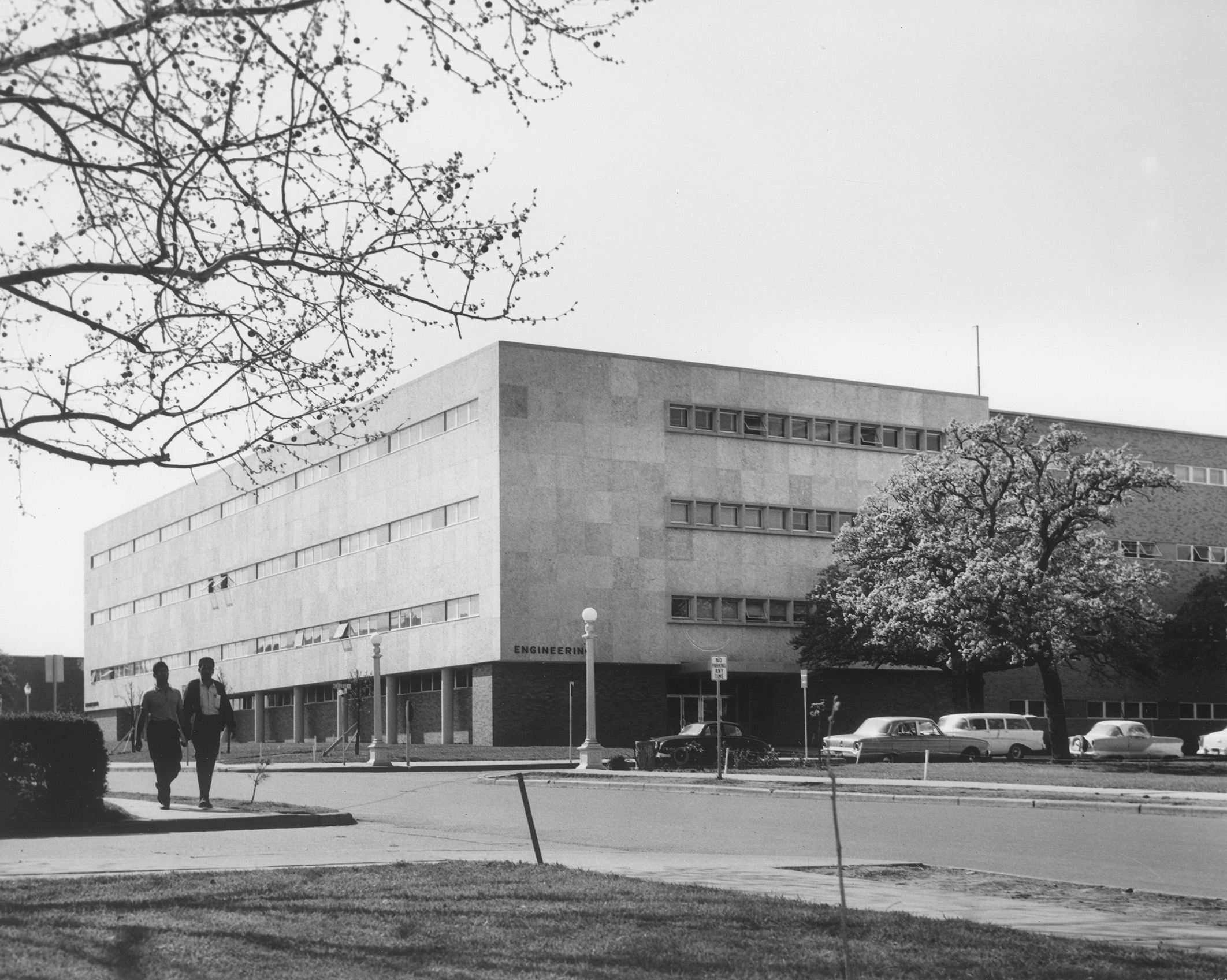
Engineering Building, built in 1960, renamed Woolf Hall

On Sept. 1, 1968, Woolf resigned the presidency and was named President Emeritus and University Professor of Engineering and Higher Education. He continued to teach courses in mechanical engineering until retiring in 1989. In addition to his career at UT Arlington, he was a consultant to several universities and educational agencies. He was the executive director of the Association of Texas Colleges and Universities for over 10 years.

Woolf was designated a "Distinguished Alumnus" of the College of Engineering of Purdue University in 1964, one of the first ten to be so honored. He also was selected to the Academy of Distinguished Graduates of Mechanical Engineering, Texas A&M University.

In 1995, UT Arlington renamed the Engineering Building, the first building constructed during his presidency, to Woolf Hall.

Jack R. Woolf died on his 90th birthday on June 10, 2014, from natural causes.

== See also ==
- University of Texas at Arlington College of Engineering
