= University of Texas at Arlington College of Engineering =

- Established: 1959
- Parent institution: University of Texas at Arlington
- Dean: Peter E. Crouch
- Faculty: 217
- Students: 9,508
- Location: Arlington, Texas, U.S. 32.732423°N 97.113838°W
- Website: College of Engineering

The University of Texas at Arlington (UTA) College of Engineering was established in 1959 when Arlington State College was officially given the status of a senior college. The college offers 12 baccalaureate, 13 Master's, and nine doctoral degrees. It celebrated its 60th anniversary in 2019 and is one of the largest engineering programs in Texas.

== History ==
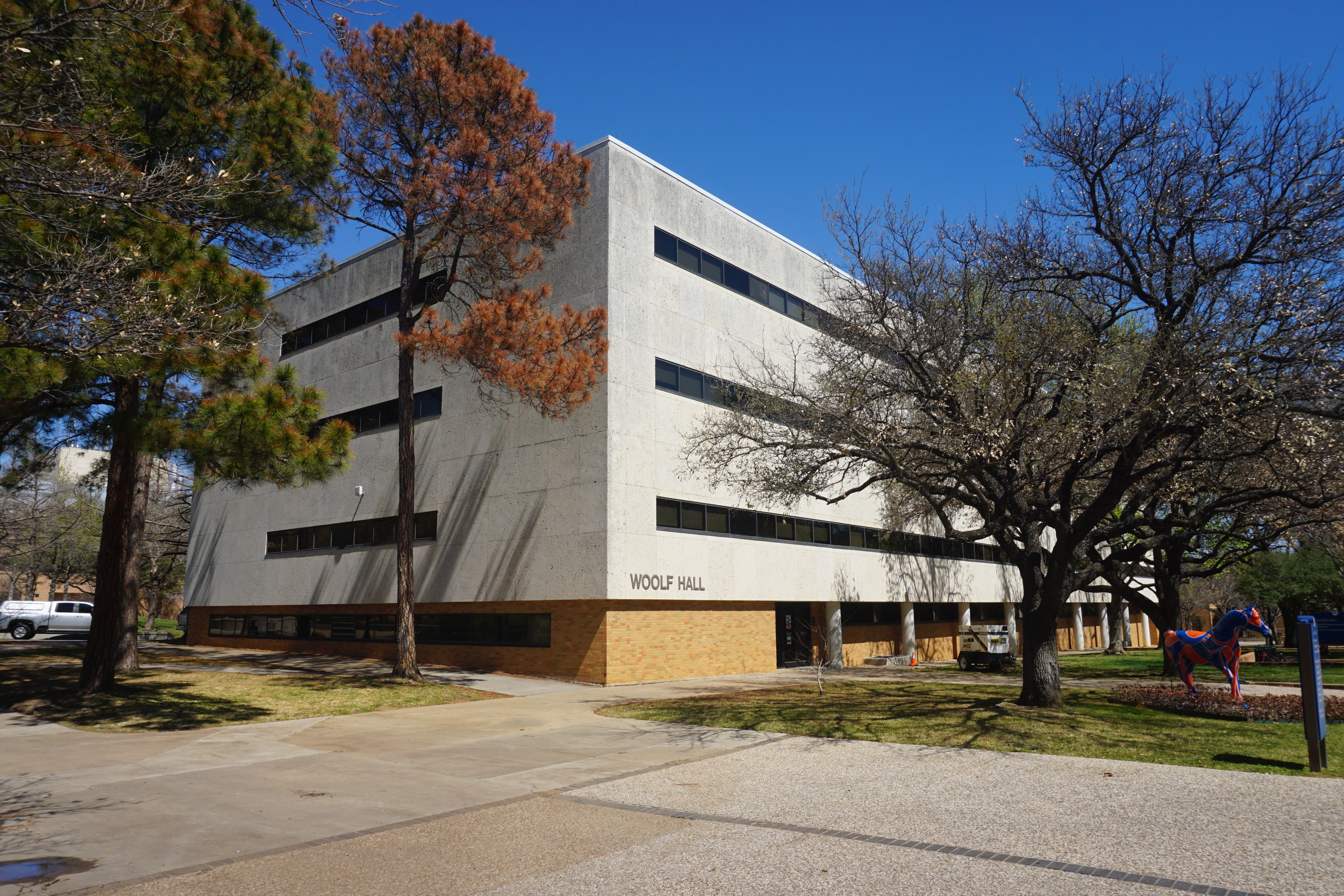
Woolf Hall houses the Mechanical and Aerospace and Industrial, Manufacturing & Systems Engineering departments

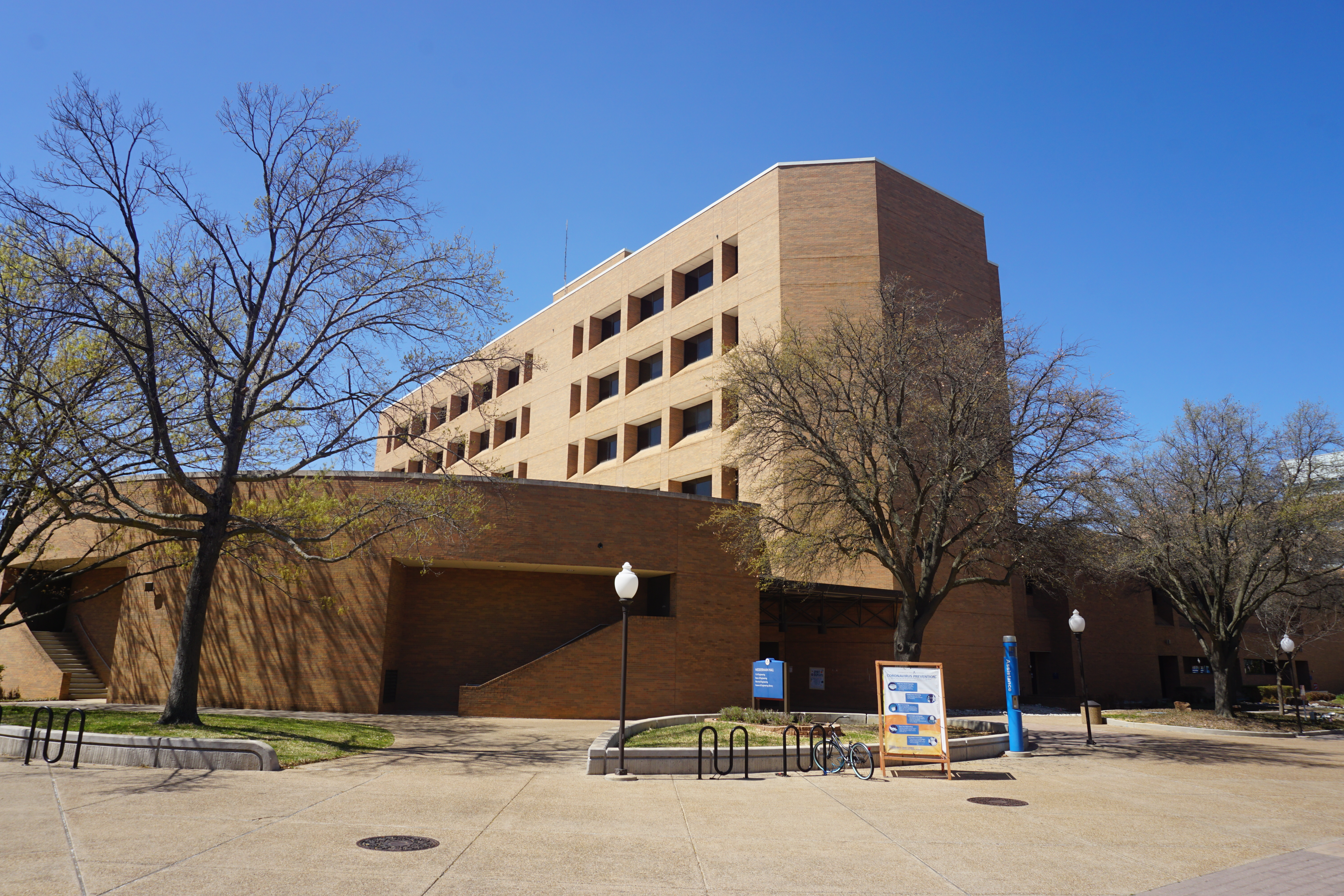
Nedderman Hall contains academic departments, lecture halls, research labs, the offices of the Dean of the College of Engineering, and an engineering library.

When Arlington State College became a senior college in 1959, baccalaureate programs in aeronautical, civil, electrical, industrial, and mechanical engineering were offered. The founding dean was Dr. Wendell H. Nedderman, who later served as president of the university beginning in 1972. The first college of engineering building (the Engineering Building, later renamed Woolf Hall after former UTA President Jack Woolf), was constructed in 1960. By 1968, all five of the baccalaureate degree programs were accredited by the Engineering Council of Professional Development. Master's degree programs were initiated during the same time frame. The university's first doctoral program, a Ph.D. in engineering, was added in 1969. In the mid-1980s, the College of Engineering added three new buildings: Nedderman Hall, the Aerodynamics Research Center, and the Automation & Robotics Research Institute (now known as the UT Arlington Research Institute, or UTARI). The original engineering building, Woolf Hall, was also remodeled.

As UTA has become a nationally recognized research university, and the College of Engineering has seen rapid growth. In 2011, the Nanotechnology Research & Teaching Facility opened. The Civil Engineering Laboratory Building was completed in 2008. An expansion of the Engineering Laboratory Building was completed in 2009, and the Engineering Research Building opened in January 2011.

UTA is the only university in North Texas to offer degrees in architectural engineering and aerospace engineering.

Today, the College of Engineering consistently ranks in the top 100 of the nation's engineering programs according to US News & World Report rankings. It is ranked among the top 4 engineering programs in Texas and the surrounding states and has more than 9,000 students in seven departments (bioengineering, civil engineering, computer science and engineering, electrical engineering, industrial, manufacturing and systems engineering, materials science and engineering, and mechanical and aerospace engineering).

== Academic departments ==
- Bioengineering
- Civil Engineering
- Computer Science and Engineering
- Electrical Engineering
- Industrial, Manufacturing, and Systems Engineering
- Materials Science and Engineering
- Mechanical and Aerospace Engineering

== Deans of the College ==
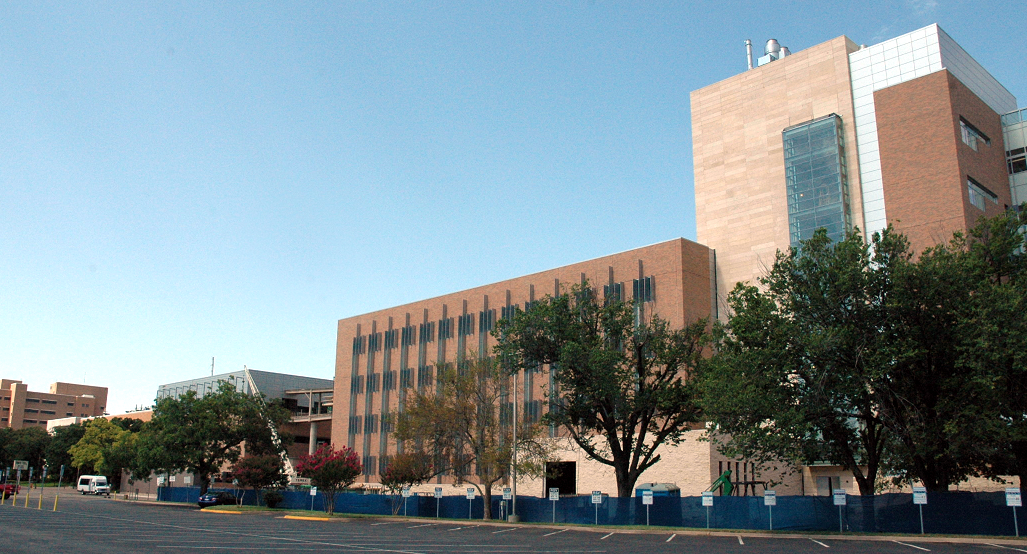
A view of three engineering buildings in 2010. Appearing from right to left are the Engineering Research Building, Engineering Lab Building, and Woolf Hall.

- 1959 Wendell Nedderman
- 1969 Andrew Sailis
- 1981 John Rouse
- 1987 John McElroy
- 1996 J. Ronald Bailey
- 2000 Bill Carroll
- 2012 Jean Pierre Bardet
- 2013 Khosrow Behbehani
- 2016 Peter Crouch

== Research centers ==
UTA College of Engineering has numerous research centers, labs and groups. Additionally, it has affiliations with the UTA Research Institute (UTARI) and the Shimadzu Nanotechnology Research and Education Center.
