= Wendell Nedderman =

American academic administrator

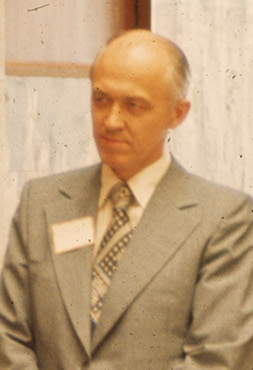

4th President of the University of Texas at Arlington
- Preceded by: Frank Harrison
- Succeeded by: Ryan C. Amacher

Personal details
- Born: Wendell Herman Nedderman; October 31, 1921 Lovilia, Iowa, U.S.
- Died: May 8, 2019 (aged 97) Frisco, Texas, U.S.
- Education: Iowa State University (BS); Texas A&M University (MS); Iowa State University (Ph.D)
- Known for: President of the University of Texas at Arlington Nedderman Hall; Distinguished Achievement Award

Wendell Herman Nedderman (October 31, 1921 – May 8, 2019) was an American academic administrator who was president of the University of Texas at Arlington for nearly 20 years, first as acting president (November 1972 – February 1974), then as president, leaving that post in July 1992. He began his 33 years of full-time service at UT Arlington in 1959 as the founding dean of the College of Engineering. This was followed by four years as vice president for academic affairs, and then 20 years as president. A campus engineering building was named Nedderman Hall in 1991 by the UT System board of regents. Campus Street and a portion of Monroe Street were combined and named Nedderman Drive by the City of Arlington in 1992. He was named president emeritus in 1992, and received the Mirabeau B. Lamar Award for Leadership in Learning from the Association of Texas Colleges and Universities. He was awarded the Anson Marston Medal for Achievement in the Field of Engineering in 2000 from Iowa State University.

== Early life and education ==
Born in Lovilia, Iowa on October 31, 1921, Nedderman attended a one-room school house as a boy, and graduated from Lovilia High School in 1939. He received a B.S. in civil engineering from Iowa State University in 1943. As a Navy V-7 reservist, he was sent to the Naval Academy at Annapolis for a period of training, after which he was commissioned an ensign and assigned to the Destroyer USS Patterson (DD392). By 1946, he had earned the Asiatic-Pacific ribbon with six stars and the Philippine Liberation ribbon with two stars as a result of campaigns in the Marianas, Philippines (Leyte and Luzon), Iwo Jima, and Okinawa. He served in the navy from May 1943 to May 1946.

== Career ==
After his discharge from the navy, Nedderman became an instructor in the department of civil engineering at Texas A&M University; he received a masters there in 1949. He earned a Ph.D. in civil engineering from Iowa State in 1951 while on leave from A&M. In 1959, he received the Faculty Distinguished Achievement Award from the Texas A&M Association of Former Students. His 12 years at A&M culminated with the rank of full professor.

Nedderman was a registered professional engineer in Iowa, Louisiana, and Texas. He was a consultant to Gulf Oil Corporation for over 30 years, and was a pioneer in offshore platform design in the 1950s and 1960s.

As the founding dean of engineering at The University of Texas at Arlington, he phased-in five B.S. degree programs by 1965 and five masters by 1969. He received authorization to commence the Ph.D. in engineering effective September 1, 1969, exactly 10 years after the founding of the new school engineering.

Effective September 1, 1968, retiring university president Dr. Jack Woolf was replaced by Dr. Frank Harrison. During the 1967-1969 presidential transition, Nedderman held three positions simultaneously: dean of engineering, graduate school administrator, and vice president for academic affairs.

== University of Texas at Arlington Presidency ==
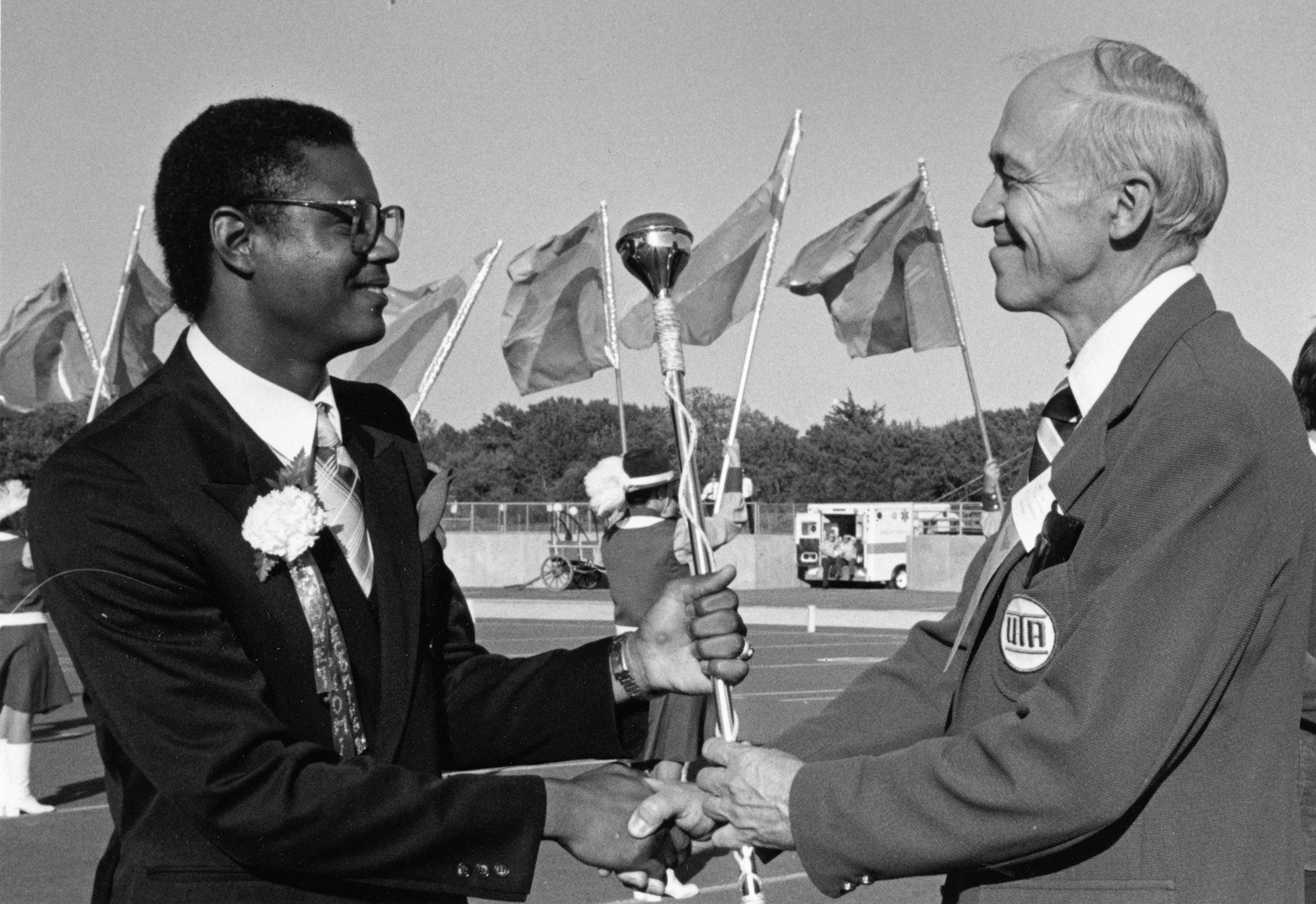
President Nedderman (right) with UTA homecoming king Rodney Lewis, 1980

In November 1972 Nedderman was named acting president of UTA, a position he held until February 1974 when he was selected the eleventh chief administrator of the institution. He continued as president until July 1992. During Dr. Nedderman's tenure as university president, 21 baccalaureate, 27 masters, and 17 doctoral degree programs were added. Enrollment increased by over 10,000, and 20 new buildings were constructed (new or major additions). The School of Nursing, School of Architecture, and the Center for Professional Teacher Education were added. The first satellite campus was added in 1987 with the establishment of a research institute on 18 acres in east Fort Worth as a result of a $10 million capital drive by the Fort Worth Chamber of Commerce and UT Arlington. His 1985 recommendation to the UT System board of regents that the football program be disbanded was accepted. The basis for the decision was that the program was draining valuable university funds, low attendance, and the negative impact of football deficits on other sports.

UT Arlington faculty and staff who contribute financially to the university are recognized as members of the "Nedderman Society" in honor of Wendell and Betty Nedderman.

== Personal life and death ==
Nedderman resided in Frisco, Texas, with his son Eric and family. His wife of 67 years, the former Betty Ann Vezey, died in January 2015 at age 89. Nedderman died on May 8, 2019, at the age of 97.

== Awards and honors ==
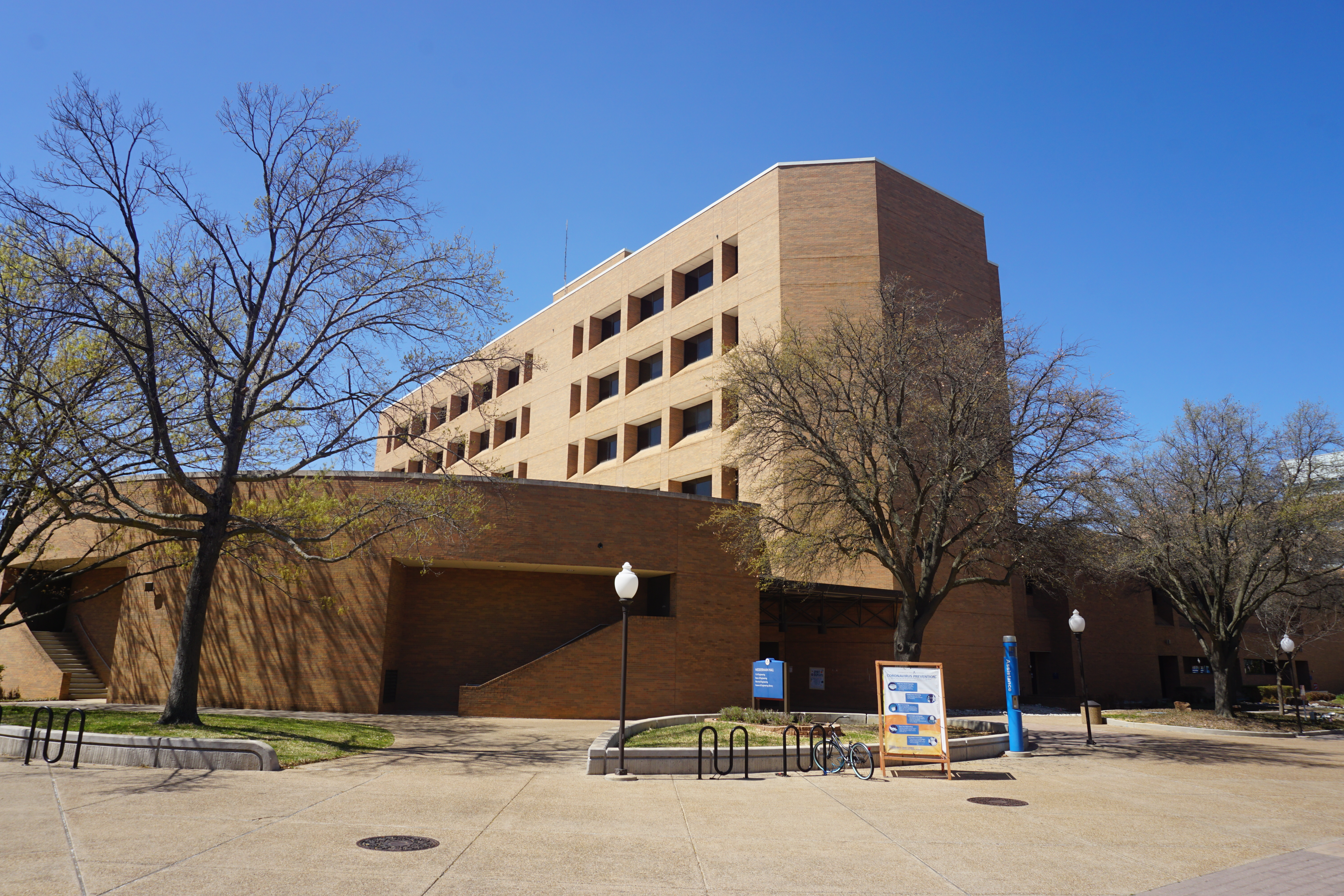
Nedderman Hall in 2021

- Asiatic-Pacific Ribbon with six stars and the Philippine Liberation Ribbon with two stars
- Scabbard and Blade Military Honor Society
- Nedderman Hall and Nedderman Drive on UT Arlington campus
- Faculty Distinguished Achievement Award by the Texas A&M Association of Former Students
- Mirabeau B. Lamar Award for Leadership in Learning by the Association of Texas Colleges and Universities.
- Anson Marston Gold Medal Award for Achievement in the Field of Engineering, by Iowa State University
- John R. Emmons National Award for Support of a Free Student Press, by Ball State University
- Service to People Award, Texas Section, American Society of Civil Engineers
- Silver Beaver Award, Longhorn Council, Boy Scouts of America
- Anson Jones Award, Scottish Rite Foundation, Fort Worth, Texas
- Wall of Fame, Albia, Iowa Community High School
- Kiwanis, Layman-of-the-Year, Division 39, Texas-Oklahoma District

== See also ==
- Nedderman Hall
