= Vistasp Karbhari =

Indian-American civil engineer

Vistasp M. Karbhari

8th President of the University of Texas at Arlington
- In office June 1, 2013 – March 19, 2020
- Preceded by: James D. Spaniolo
- Succeeded by: Teik C. Lim (interim) Jennifer Cowley

Personal details
- Born: India
- Education: Pune University; University of Delaware
- Profession: Professor of Engineer
- Website: https://www.uta.edu/academics/faculty/profile?username=karbhari

Vistasp Karbhari is an Indian-American civil engineer and former university administrator. Karbhari was the eighth president of the University of Texas at Arlington. Prior to that, he was provost and executive vice president for academic affairs at the University of Alabama in Huntsville. He is known for his research in composite materials and structural engineering.

== Life and career ==
Karbhari earned his Bachelor of Engineering (in civil engineering, 1984) and Master of Engineering (1985) degrees from the University of Pune in India, and PhD (1991) from the University of Delaware. Before moving to Alabama in 2008, he was a professor of structural engineering and of materials science at the University of California, San Diego. He is author or co-author on over 500 publications in refereed journals, conference articles, and book chapters and is the editor or co-editor of six books. He serves on the editorial boards of numerous international journals, including as associate editor of the Journal of Civil Structural Health Monitoring, American editor of the International Journal of Materials and Product Technology, on the editorial board of the ASTM Journal of Testing and Evaluation and the Indian Concrete Journal, among others.

As president of The University of Texas at Arlington, Karbhari was recognized for leading the university to Carnegie R-1 status and being designated as a Hispanic Serving Institution and for his initiatives on enhancing social mobility, student success and for STEM. Under his tenure, the College of Engineering at the University of Texas at Arlington has seen an increase in enrollment and funding. On November 24, 2020, the American Association for the Advancement of Science selected Karbhari as a Fellow for his work in composites in civil infrastructure. The AAAS is the world's largest general scientific society and publisher of the journal Science.

Karbhari is also a fellow of the National Academy of Inventors, ASM International, American Society of Civil Engineers (ASCE), Structural Engineering Institute of ASCE, International Institute for Fiber-Reinforced Polymers in Construction, and the International Society for Structural Health Monitoring of Intelligent Infrastructure. In 2019, he was elected a member of the European Academy of Sciences and Arts. In 2021, he was named a Fellow of Complete College America. In 2022, he was named a Fierce Education Leader. He initiated a curriculum in the Department of Engineering to introduce students to foundational AI concepts and their ethical applications.

== Controversies ==
Karbhari's tenure as president of the University of Texas at Arlington had controversies that led to his resignation on March 19, 2020. They included a lawsuit alleging bullying, mistreating and discriminating against four female administrators and a performance evaluation and later assessment that noted "an atypically high turnover rate" of administrators.

A 2019 audit report on online education recruiting and enrollment practices showed that Karbhari violated UT System rules and the Texas Administrative Code, including conflict of interest and administrative procedures. The report was released March 19, 2020, followed by Karbhari’s immediate resignation. He remains as an engineering faculty member.
