= James D. Spaniolo =

American attorney and academic (born 1946)

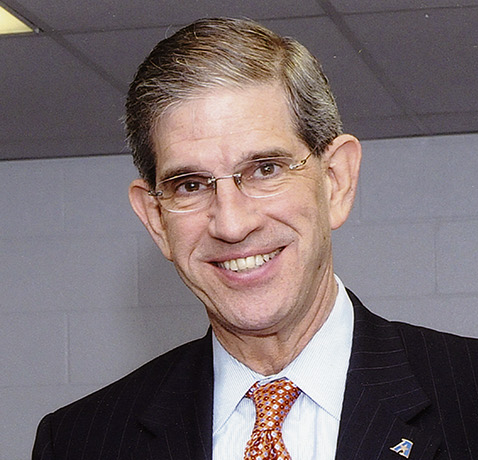

7th President of the University of Texas at Arlington
- Preceded by: Charles A. Sorber, President Ad Interim
- Succeeded by: Vistasp Karbhari

Personal details
- Born: April 6, 1946 (age 80) Greenville, Michigan, U.S.
- Education: Michigan State University; University of Michigan; University of Michigan Law School
- Known for: University and corporate administration

James Dingwall Spaniolo (born April 6, 1946) is an American attorney, professor, and former university administrator. He was the president of the University of Texas at Arlington from 2004 until his retirement in 2013.

As an attorney, he specializes in communications and constitutional law. He served in various legal and executive capacities with the Miami Herald, the Detroit Free Press, the American Newspaper Publishers Association, and the Knight Foundation. He was dean of the College of Communication Arts and Sciences at Michigan State University for nine years before becoming president of University of Texas at Arlington.

== Biography ==
=== Education ===
Spaniolo was born on 6 April 1946 in Greenville, in the U.S. state of Michigan. He graduated from Cassopolis High School, Cassopolis, Michigan in 1964 and entered Michigan State University, where he was editor-in-chief of campus daily newspaper The State News. In 1968, he graduated with high honors from Michigan State University with a bachelor's degree in political science.

He served in the U.S. Army Reserves as Specialist IV, Medical Corpsman from 1968 to 1974. From 1970 to 1972 he was also assistant to the president at Michigan State University. He earned a master's degree in public administration from The University of Michigan Institute of Public Policy Studies (now the Gerald R. Ford School of Public Policy) as well as a J.D. degree from The University of Michigan Law School in 1975.

=== Career ===
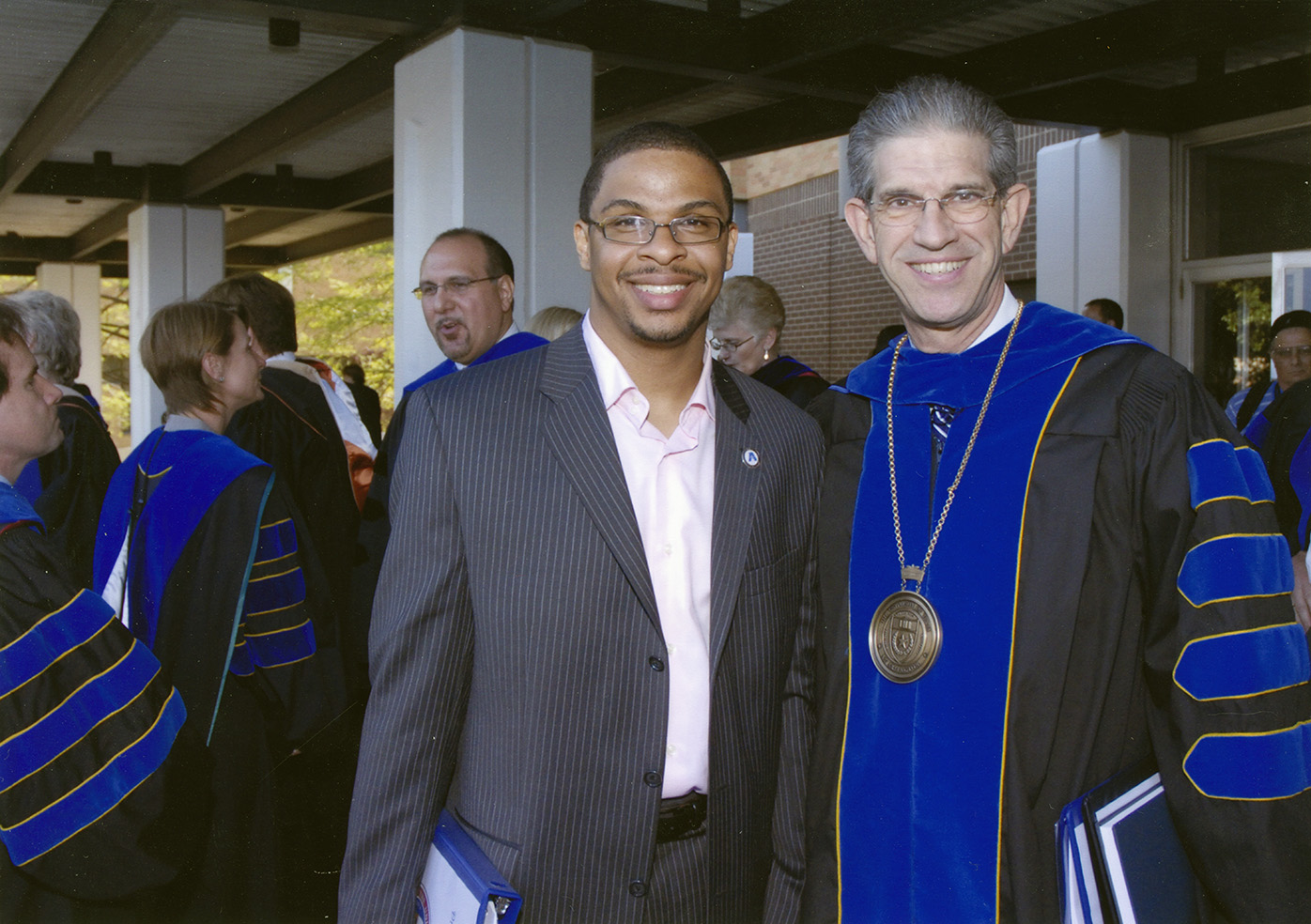
Spaniolo as president of the University of Texas at Arlington, with Roland G. Fryer Jr.

In 1975, Spaniolo joined the law firm of Paul and Thomson in Miami, Florida as an attorney where he handed a variety of cases. He became staff counsel to the Miami Herald from 1977 to 1978.

From 1978 to 1979, Spaniolo was associate general counsel for American Newspaper Publishers Association, now incorporated within the Newspaper Association of America. He joined the Miami Herald in 1979 first as general counsel until 1983 then as general executive from 1983 to 1985. From 1985 to 1989 Spaniolo was vice president for human resources and assistant to the publisher for The Detroit Free Press. Following his association with The Detroit Free Press Spaniolo joined the John S. and James L. Knight Foundation as vice president and chief program officer and secretary of the foundation.

In 1996, he became dean of the College of Communication Arts and Sciences and professor at the School of Journalism at Michigan State University, positions he held until 2004, when Spaniolo was named president of the University of Texas at Arlington, where he also served as professor of communication and professor of public affairs. In 2013, he retired from University of Texas at Arlington and became Higher Education Advisor to the Governor of the State of Michigan.

=== Awards and activities ===
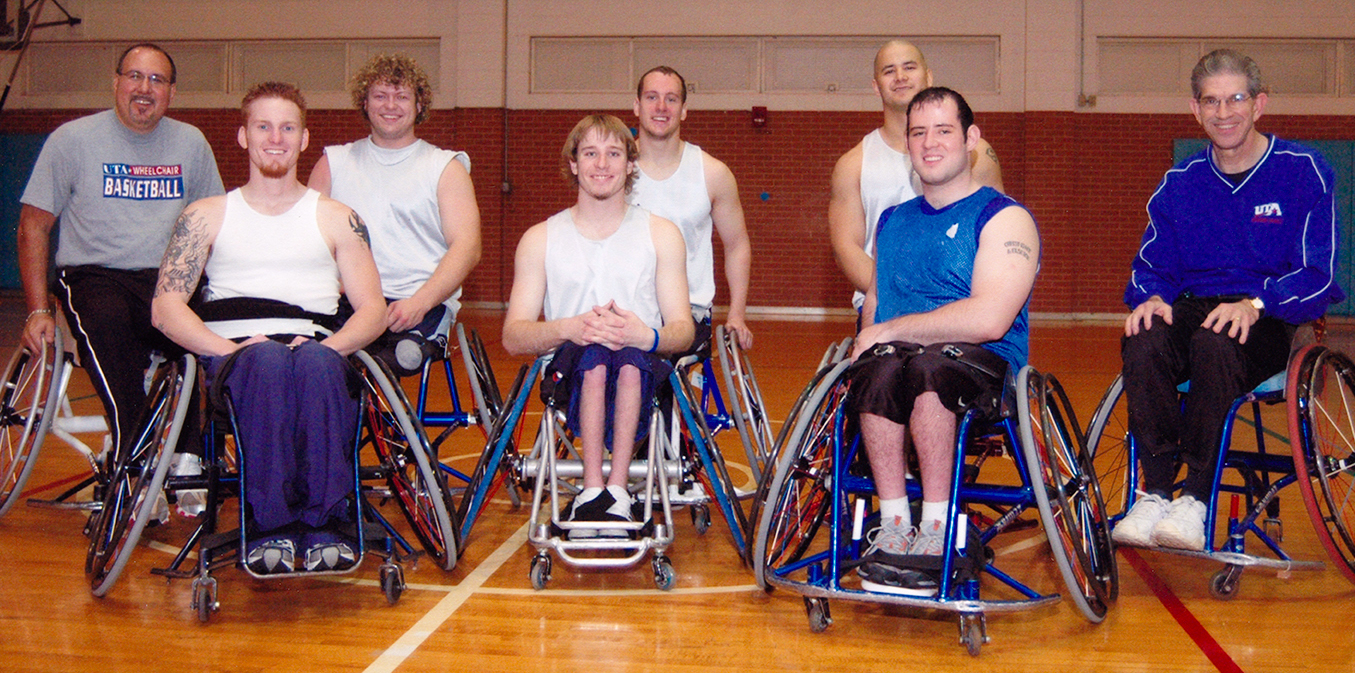
Spaniolo with the UTA Movin' Mavs in 2006

The Arlington Chamber of Commerce STAR Award, annual recognition of a community leader (2012), Sally Kallam Award for support of Leadership Arlington and growth of leaders in the community (2010), Silver Eagle Award from the Boy Scouts of America for service to the Arlington community (2009), Scoffes Award to the MSU faculty member who demonstrated a sustained commitment to the academic success of the MSU Football program (2001), board of directors, Miami Donors Forum, vice chairman, Legal Affairs Committee, ANPA and member of join task force on press/bar relations with the American Bar Association, lecturer, Annual Communications Law Seminar, The Practicing Law Institute, New York, Commencement speaker, College of Communications, University of Miami, Member, Michigan Governor's Commission on Higher Education, chairperson, advisory board, Detroit Public Education Fund, James D. Spaniolo First Generation Scholarship
