= 2010–11 Big East Conference men's basketball season =

- League: NCAA Division I
- Sport: Basketball
- Duration: December 27, 2010 through March 5, 2011
- Teams: 16
- Total attendance: 3,003,173
- Average attendance: 11,082
- TV partner(s): Big East Network, ESPN

Regular Season
- Champion: Pittsburgh (15–3)
- Runners-up: Notre Dame (14–4)
- Season MVP: Ben Hansbrough (ND)

Tournament
- Champions: Connecticut
- Runners-up: Louisville
- Finals MVP: Kemba Walker (CONN)

Big East Conference men's basketball seasons
- ← 2009–10 2011–12 →

2010–11 Big East men's basketball standings
	Conf.				Overall
Team	W		L	PCT	W		L	PCT
No. 4 Pittsburgh	15	–	3	.833	28	–	6	.824
No. 5 Notre Dame	14	–	4	.778	27	–	7	.794
*No. 12 Syracuse	12	–	6	.667	27	–	8	.771
No. 14 Louisville	12	–	6	.667	25	–	10	.714
No. 18 St. John's	12	–	6	.667	21	–	12	.636
Cincinnati	11	–	7	.611	26	–	9	.743
No. 22 West Virginia	11	–	7	.611	21	–	12	.636
Georgetown	10	–	8	.556	21	–	11	.656
No. 9 Connecticut†	9	–	9	.500	32	–	9	.780
Villanova	9	–	9	.500	21	–	12	.636
Marquette	9	–	9	.500	22	–	15	.595
Seton Hall	7	–	11	.389	13	–	18	.419
Rutgers	5	–	13	.278	15	–	17	.469
Providence	4	–	14	.222	15	–	17	.469
South Florida	3	–	15	.167	10	–	23	.303
DePaul	1	–	17	.056	7	–	24	.226
† 2011 Big East tournament winner As of April 4, 2011; *Syracuse:: 7 wins vacated due to sanctions against the program; Disputed record: Syracuse–(27–8)(10–6); Rankings from AP Poll

The 2010–11 Big East Conference men's basketball season was the 32nd season of competitive basketball played by the Big East Conference, since its inception in 1979, and involved its 16 full-time member schools. The season officially opened on December 27, 2010, when Pittsburgh defeated Connecticut, 78–63, and ended on March 5, 2011, with a 72–56 victory for St. John's over South Florida.

Pittsburgh captured the regular season title for the fourth time, and third outright, with a conference win–loss record of 15–3. The Panthers also received the no. 1 seed in the Big East tournament, and a bye into the quarterfinals, along with 2nd-seed Notre Dame, 3rd-seed Louisville, and 4th-seed Syracuse. St. John's, West Virginia, Cincinnati, and Georgetown rounded out the top eight, and all received a bye into the tournament's second round. Play began at noon on Tuesday, March 8 in Madison Square Garden, when 9th-seed Connecticut defeated 16th-seed DePaul, 97–71. Play ended on Saturday, March 12, when Connecticut won their fifth game in five days, defeating Louisville, 69–66, for their seventh Big East Championship.

At the finish of the regular season, prior to seeding for the 2011 NCAA Division I men's basketball tournament, it was widely speculated that the Big East would eclipse its NCAA record 8 bids, sending as many as 11 teams to the tournament. The official tournament selection process took place on Sunday, March 13, and the predictions were accurate, as the following 11 Big East teams received bids into the tournament. Connecticut won the national title, its third-ever national championship.

== Preseason ==
=== Coaching changes ===
Prior to the start of the 2010–11 season, four Big East programs hired new coaches, following the dismissal or resignation of their former coaches:

- DePaul: Jerry Wainwright was fired in the middle of the 2009–10 season, after a 7–8 start, and a 22-game Big East losing streak. Wainwright, who compiled a 59–80 record, and a 20–51 conference record, in five seasons at the school, was replaced on an interim basis by assistant coach Tracy Webster, who remained with the team until a new head coach was hired. On April 6, 2010, Clemson head coach Oliver Purnell was named the 13th head coach of the Blue Demons.
- Rutgers: After a lackluster performance by the Scarlet Knights during his four-year tenure, and a postseason incident at a Pittsburgh—Rutgers baseball game, in which he got into a shouting match with several of the Pittsburgh coaches, Fred Hill resigned his position as head coach on April 19, 2010. It was reported that Hill had been asked to return for the 2010–11 season, however the shouting incident prompted Rutgers athletic director Tim Pernetti to ask for Hill's resignation, settling for an $850,000 contract buyout in exchange. On May 6, 2010, Robert Morris head coach Mike Rice Jr. was announced as the 17th head coach of the Scarlet Knights. Rice came to Rutgers after a successful three-year tenure at Robert Morris, achieving a 73–31 (.702) record, a 46–8 (.852) conference record, and two consecutive Northeast Conference tournament championships, leading to automatic bids into both the 2009 and 2010 NCAA Tournaments.
- Seton Hall: Bobby Gonzalez was fired on March 17, 2010 after four tumultuous seasons with the Pirates, in which both his on and off court actions were heavily scrutinized. The decision followed Seton Hall's 87–69 loss to Texas Tech in the first round of the 2010 National Invitation Tournament, in which then-sophomore forward Herb Pope was ejected from the game for punching Texas Tech player Darko Cohadarevic in the groin, and Gonzalez himself received his seventh technical foul of the season. In a statement, Seton Hall University president Monsignor Robert Sheeran said he told Gonzalez that he had "lost [his] confidence in [Gonzalez's] ability to coach and lead this program," and had made the decision to fire Gonzalez on his own after consulting members of the campus community. On March 29, 2010, former assistant to Rick Pitino at Louisville and Iona head coach Kevin Willard was named the 19th head coach of the Pirates.
- St. John's: Norm Roberts was fired as head coach on March 19, 2010, after losing its first round NIT game against Memphis, 73–71. Roberts left the team after six seasons, compiling an 81–101 (.445) record, a 32–70 (.314) conference record, and only one winning season. He was replaced on March 31, 2010 by former UCLA head coach (1996–2003) and then-ESPN analyst Steve Lavin.

=== Conference predictions ===
At Big East media day in October, the conference released their predictions for standings and All-Big East teams.

==== Predicted Big East results ====
	Big East Coaches	Big East Writers	Rivals.com
1.	Pittsburgh (12*)	Pittsburgh (10)	Pittsburgh
2.	Villanova (1)	Villanova (3)	Villanova
3.	Syracuse (2)	Syracuse (2)	Syracuse
4.	Georgetown	Georgetown	West Virginia
5.	West Virginia	West Virginia (1)	Georgetown
6.	St. John's (1)	Marquette	Marquette
7.	Notre Dame	St. John's	Seton Hall
8.	Louisville (tie)	Louisville	St. John's
9.	Marquette (tie)	Notre Dame	Connecticut
10.	Connecticut	Connecticut	Notre Dame
11.	Seton Hall	Seton Hall	Louisville
12.	Cincinnati	Cincinnati	Cincinnati
13.	South Florida	South Florida	South Florida
14.	Providence	Rutgers (tie)	DePaul
15.	Rutgers	Providence (tie)	Providence
16.	DePaul	DePaul	Rutgers
	* first place votes		

==== Preseason All-Big East teams ====
First Team	Second Team	Honorable Mention
Austin Freeman, G., GTWN; Kemba Walker, G., CONN; Ashton Gibbs, G., PITT; Jeremy Hazell, G., HALL; Corey Fisher, G., VILL; Kevin Jones, F., WVU	Chris Wright, G., GTWN; Jimmy Butler, F., MARQ; Tim Abromaitis, F., ND; D. J. Kennedy, G., SJ; Kris Joseph, F., SYR	Yancy Gates, F., CIN; Darius Johnson-Odom, G., MARQ; Rick Jackson, F., SYR

Big East Preseason Player of the Year: Austin Freeman, G., Georgetown
Big East Preseason Rookie of the Year: Fab Melo, C., Syracuse

=== Preseason national polls ===
	AP	Coaches	Athlon	Lindy's	Sporting News	Fox Sports	CBS Sports	Rivals.com	Blue Ribbon Yearbook
Cincinnati									
Connecticut	RV								
DePaul									
Georgetown	20	21			17				17
Louisville		RV							
Marquette		RV							
Notre Dame									
Pittsburgh	5	4	8	5	10	6	5	4	4
Providence									
Rutgers									
St. John's									
Seton Hall									
South Florida									
Syracuse	10	13	9	21	7	20	20	8	13
Villanova	6	6	6	13	11	7	9	7	6
West Virginia	RV	RV	19					23	

=== Watchlists ===
On October 4, the Wooden Award preseason watch list included seven Big East players. The watchlist was composed of 50 players who were not transfers, freshmen or medical redshirts. On October 29, the Naismith College Player of the Year watchlist of 50 players was announced, which included seven Big East names.

	Wooden	Naismith
Corey Fisher, VILL	✓	✓
Austin Freeman, GTWN	✓	✓
Ashton Gibbs, PITT	✓	✓
Jeremy Hazell, HALL	✓	✓
Kevin Jones, WVU		✓
Kris Joseph, SYR	✓	✓
Brandon Triche, SYR	✓	
Kemba Walker, CONN	✓	✓

== Regular season ==
=== Season summary & highlights ===
- Pittsburgh won the 2K Sports Coaches vs. Cancer Classic, defeating Texas in the finals, 68–66.
- Georgetown won the Charleston Classic, defeating North Carolina State, 82–67.
- Connecticut won the Maui Invitational Tournament, upsetting #2 Michigan State in the semifinals, 70–67, and #8 Kentucky in the finals, 84–67. The wins propelled Connecticut from receiving votes in the AP Poll on November 22 to a #7 ranking on the next poll date, November 29.
- St. John's won the Great Alaska Shootout, defeating Arizona State, 67–58.
- Notre Dame won the Old Spice Classic, defeating Wisconsin, 58–51.
- Syracuse won the Legends Classic, defeating Georgia Tech, 80–76.
- On February 23, Providence's Marshon Brooks scored 52 points in a loss to Notre Dame, breaking the Big East single-game record of 48 points set by Providence's Eric Murdock in 1991.
- In February, following the result of an investigation into recruiting violations, Connecticut coach Jim Calhoun was suspended by the NCAA for three Big East games during the 2011–12 season. The investigation began after a March 2009 Yahoo! Sports report that a former team manager and agent provided former recruit Nate Miles with housing, transportation, meals and representation, that members of Calhoun's staff were aware of this, and that staff members were in violation of NCAA limits on contacting Miles. Dennis Thomas, chairman of the NCAA Committee on Infractions, stated that Calhoun was cited for "not being on top of these issues with the agent, the booster." The team will also be required to forfeit one scholarship, from 13 to 12, and 40 recruiting days, from 130 to 90, for the three upcoming seasons, and will be on probation until February 21, 2014.
- On March 5, Providence's Marshon Brooks scored 28 points in a regular season-ending win over Rutgers, giving him 468 points for the Big East regular season, breaking the previous single-season record of 462 points set in 1994 by Donyell Marshall of Connecticut.
- On the same day, Syracuse beat DePaul by 48 points, 107–59, in the most lopsided victory in the history of Big East conference play. The Orange also had 12 players combine for 71.4 percent field goal shooting, as well as 77.8 percent from 3-point range and 90.9 percent at the foul line.

=== Midseason watchlists ===
On January 6, the Wooden Award midseason watchlist was released, and included five Big East players. The list was composed of 30 players, reduced from the preseason list of 50. Newcomers included senior forward Marshon Brooks of Providence, senior forward Rick Jackson of Syracuse, and senior guard Brad Wanamaker of Pittsburgh. In addition, five Big East players who were on the preseason list did not appear at midseason: Corey Fisher, Ashton Gibbs, Jeremy Hazell, Kris Joseph, and Brandon Triche. On February 11, the Naismith Top 30 was announced, and included newcomers Jackson, Wanamaker, and Notre Dame guard Ben Hansbrough. Meanwhile, Fisher, Gibbs, Hazell, Kevin Jones, and Joseph, who were on the preseason list, did not appear at midseason.

	Wooden	Naismith
Marshon Brooks, PROV	✓	
Austin Freeman, GTWN	✓	✓
Ben Hansbrough, ND		✓
Rick Jackson, SYR	✓	✓
Kemba Walker, CONN	✓	✓
Brad Wanamaker, PITT	✓	✓

=== Statistical leaders ===
The regular season team, individual, and attendance figures include all conference and non-conference games played from November 8, 2010 through March 5, 2011.

==== Team ====
Scoring Offense
Rk	Team	Games	Points	PPG
1	Marquette	31	2377	76.7
2	Providence	31	2360	76.1
3	Notre Dame	30	2266	75.5
4	Louisville	31	2332	75.2
5	Pittsburgh	31	2296	74.1

Scoring Defense
Rk	Team	Games	Points	PPG
1	Cincinnati	31	1804	58.2
2	Pittsburgh	31	1875	60.5
3	Syracuse	31	1941	62.6
4	West Virginia	30	1920	64.0
5	Louisville	31	1995	64.4

Scoring Margin
Rk	Team	Offense	Defense	Margin
1	Pittsburgh	74.1	60.5	+13.6
2	Syracuse	73.5	62.6	+10.9
3	Louisville	75.2	64.4	+10.9
4	Cincinnati	69.0	58.2	+10.8
5	Notre Dame	75.5	65.5	+10.0

Free throw percentage
Rk	Team	FTM	FTA	Pct
1	Villanova	548	728	.753
2	Connecticut	432	587	.736
3	Georgetown	393	538	.730
4	Notre Dame	532	736	.723
5	St. John's	513	721	.712

Field goal percentage
Rk	Team	FGM	FGA	Pct
1	Georgetown	767	1599	.480
2	Syracuse	833	1757	.474
3	Marquette	833	1761	.473
4	Pittsburgh	808	1712	.472
5	Notre Dame	746	1608	.464

3-Pt Field goal percentage
Rk	Team	3FGM	3FGA	Pct
1	Notre Dame	242	618	.392
2	Pittsburgh	180	471	.382
3	Georgetown	213	583	.365
4	Louisville	272	750	.363
5	Marquette	174	467	.351

Rebounding Margin
Rk	Team	Avg	Opp Avg	Marg
1	Pittsburgh	40.4	29.4	+11.0
2	Notre Dame	37.0	31.9	+5.1
3	Cincinnati	35.7	30.9	+4.8
4	Villanova	37.3	32.6	+4.7
5	Syracuse	37.6	33.6	+4.0

Offensive Rebounds
Rk	Team	Games	No.	Avg/G
1	West Virginia	30	437	14.6
2	Providence	31	451	14.5
3	Connecticut	30	435	14.5
4	Pittsburgh	31	446	14.4
5	Cincinnati	31	405	13.1

Defensive Rebounds
Rk	Team	Games	No.	Avg/G
1	Notre Dame	30	780	26.0
2	Pittsburgh	31	805	26.0
3	Syracuse	31	788	25.4
4	Connecticut	30	756	25.2
5	Villanova	31	776	25.0

Blocks
Rk	Team	Games	No.	Avg/G
1	Syracuse	31	208	6.7
2	Connecticut	30	174	5.8
3	Louisville	31	155	5.0
4	Rutgers	30	137	4.6
5	Providence	31	139	4.5

Assists
Rk	Team	Games	No.	Avg/G
1	Pittsburgh	31	544	17.5
2	Louisville	31	540	17.4
3	Notre Dame	30	500	16.7
4	Syracuse	31	505	16.3
5	Marquette	31	501	16.2

Steals
Rk	Team	Games	No.	Avg/G
1	Louisville	31	294	9.5
2	Syracuse	31	270	8.7
3	St. John's	30	244	8.1
4	Providence	31	245	7.9
5	Cincinnati	31	244	7.9

==== Individual ====
Scoring
Rk	Name	GP	Pts	Avg/G
1	Marshon Brooks, PROV	31	768	24.8
2	Kemba Walker, CONN	30	694	23.1
3	Ben Hansbrough, ND	30	556	18.5
4	Dwight Hardy, SJU	30	538	17.9
5	Austin Freeman, GTWN	30	534	17.8

Rebounding
Rk	Name	GP	Reb	Avg/G
1	Rick Jackson, SYR	31	332	10.7
2	Alex Oriakhi, CONN	30	249	8.3
3	Herb Pope, HALL	29	232	8.0
4	Gary McGhee, PITT	31	241	7.8
5	Kevin Jones, WVU	30	223	7.4

Assists
Rk	Name	GP	No.	Avg/G
1	Scoop Jardine, SYR	31	186	6.0
2	Vincent Council, PROV	31	182	5.9
3	Chris Wright, GTWN	28	150	5.4
4	Brad Wanamaker, PITT	31	160	5.2
5	Peyton Siva, LOU	31	156	5.0

Steals
Rk	Name	GP	No.	Avg/G
1	Peyton Siva, LOU	31	66	2.1
2	Duke Mondy, PROV	28	59	2.1
3	Preston Knowles, LOU	30	56	1.9
4	D. J. Kennedy, SJU	30	55	1.8
5	Kemba Walker, CONN	30	54	1.8

Blocks
Rk	Name	GP	No.	Avg/G
1	Rick Jackson, SYR	31	77	2.5
2	John Flowers, WVU	30	73	2.4
3	Gorgui Dieng, LOU	25	52	2.1
4	Julian Vaughn, GTWN	29	58	2.0
5	Alex Oriakhi, CONN; Terrence Jennings, LOU	30	56	1.9

Field Goals
Rk	Name	FGM	FGA	PCT
1	Rick Jackson, SYR	173	291	.595
2	Nasir Robinson, PITT	99	185	.535
3	Gilvydas Biruta, RUT	102	192	.531
4	Terrence Jennings, LOU	111	212	.524
5	Cleveland Melvin, DEP	163	312	.522

3-Pt Field Goals
Rk	Name	3PM	3PA	PCT
1	Ashton Gibbs, PITT	89	191	.466
2	Kyle Kuric, LOU	61	134	.455
3	Ben Hansbrough, ND	78	173	.451
4	Hollis Thompson, GTWN	36	80	.450
5	Corey Stokes, VILL	82	190	.432

Free Throws
Rk	Name	FTM	FTA	PCT
1	Corey Stokes, VILL; Ashton Gibbs, PITT	77	86	.895
3	Austin Freeman, GTWN	85	98	.867
4	Casey Mitchell, WVU	68	79	.861
5	Dwight Hardy, SJU	141	167	.844
6	Brandon Triche, SYR	69	83	.831

==== Attendance ====
Rk	Team	Home Gms.	Home Att.	Avg. Home	Away Gms.	Away Att.	Avg. Away	Neut. Gms.	Neut. Att.	Avg. Neut.	Total Gms.	Total Att.	Avg.
1	Syracuse	19	423,924	22,312	9	145,534	16,170	3	30,935	10,312	31	600,393	19,368
2	Louisville	21	458,463	21,832	10	100,117	10,012	0	0	0	31	558,580	18,019
3	Marquette	18	280,545	15,586	11	116,060	10,551	2	n/a	n/a	31	396,605	13,676*
4	West Virginia	14	160,567	11,469	11	146,510	13,319	5	50,467	10,093	30	357,544	11,918
5	Georgetown	14	177,448	12,675	12	150,068	12,506	4	23,403	5,851	30	350,919	11,697
6	Pittsburgh	18	195,182	10,843	9	103,829	11,537	4	51,959	12,990	31	350,970	11,322
7	Connecticut	17	196,671	11,569	10	132,723	13,272	3	7,200	2,400	30	336,594	11,220
8	Villanova	17	178,692	10,511	12	117,343	9,779	2	13,974	6,987	31	310,009	10,000
9	Seton Hall	15	119,060	7,937	11	123,899	11,264	4	3,365	3,365**	31	246,324	9,123**
10	St. John's	15	126,466	8,431	12	121,573	10,131	3	15,270	5,090	30	263,309	8,777
11	Notre Dame	17	132,350	7,785	9	111,886	12,432	4	9,333	3,111†	30	253,569	8,743†
12	DePaul	17	130,486	7,676	10	116,571	11,657	3	4,995	2,498‡	30	252,052	8,691‡
13	Cincinnati	18	132,194	7,344	12	122,472	10,206	1	6,016	6,016	31	260,682	8,409
14	Providence	19	133,815	7,043	10	122,776	12,278	2	745	372	31	257,336	8,301
15	Rutgers	16	89,636	5,602	11	100,118	9,102	3	29,786	9,929	30	219,540	7,318
16	South Florida	16	67,674	4,230	13	88,381	6,799	2	1,100	1,100§	31	157,155	5,239§
	TOTALS	271	3,003,173	11,082	172	1,919,860	11,162	45	248,548	6,717^	488	5,171,581	10,774^
* – does not factor two neutral games played, vs. Duke and Gonzaga, in the 2010 CBE Classic, which do not have attendance figures on record. Overall average is therefore calculated based on the 29 games with attendance figures. ** – does not factor three neutral games played, vs. Alabama, Clemson, and Arkansas, which do not have attendance figures on record. Averages are therefore calculated based on the one neutral game and 27 total games with attendance figures. † – does not factor one neutral game played, vs. Kentucky, in the 2010 SEC/Big East Invitational, which does not have an attendance figure on record. Averages are therefore calculated based on the 3 neutral games and 29 total games with attendance figures. ‡ – does not factor one neutral game played, vs. Stanford, in the 2010 76 Classic, which does not have an attendance figure on record. Averages are therefore calculated based on the 2 neutral games and 29 total games with attendance figures. § – does not factor one neutral game played, vs. Texas Tech, in the 2010 South Padre Island Invitational, which does not have an attendance figure on record. Averages are therefore calculated based on the one neutral game and 30 total games with attendance figures.^ – due to games without attendance figures, overall averages are therefore calculated based on the 37 neutral games and 480 total games with attendance figures.

== Postseason ==
=== Big East tournament ===
For the third straight year, all 16 teams in the conference participated in the Big East tournament. Under this format, the teams finishing 9 through 16 in the regular season standings played first round games, while teams 5 through 8 received a bye to the second round. The top 4 teams during the regular season received a bye to the quarterfinals. The five-round tournament spanned five consecutive days, from Tuesday, March 8, through Saturday, March 12, at Madison Square Garden in New York City.

2011 Big East men's basketball tournament seeds and results
Seed	School	Conf.	Over.	Tiebreaker	First round Tuesday, March 8	Second round Wednesday, March 9	Quarterfinals Thursday, March 10	Semifinals Friday, March 11	Championship Saturday, March 12
1.	‡†Pittsburgh	15–3	27–5		BYE	BYE	#9 CONN, L, 74–76		
2.	†Notre Dame	14–4	26–6		BYE	BYE	#7 CIN – W, 89–51	#3 LOU – L, 77–83^{OT}	
3.	†Louisville	12–6	25–9	2–0 vs. SYR/SJU	BYE	BYE	#11 MARQ – W, 81–56	#2 ND – W, 83–77^{OT}	#9 CONN – L, 66–69
4.	†Syracuse	12–6	26–7	1–1 vs. LOU/SJU	BYE	BYE	#5 SJU – W, 79–73	#9 CONN – L, 71–76^{OT}	
5.	#St. John's	12–6	21–11	0–2 vs. LOU/SYR	BYE	#13 RUT – W, 65–63	#4 SYR – L, 73–79		
6.	#West Virginia	11–7	20–11	1–0 vs. CIN	BYE	#11 MARQ – L, 61–67			
7.	#Cincinnati	11–7	25–8	0–1 vs. WVU	BYE	#15 USF – W, 87–61	#2 ND – L, 51–89		
8.	#Georgetown	10–8	21–10		BYE	#9 CONN – L, 62–79			
9.	Connecticut	9–9	26–9	2–1 vs. VILL/MARQ	#16 DEP – W, 97–71	#8 GTWN – W, 79–62	#1 PITT – W, 76–74	#4 SYR – W, 76–71^{OT}	#3 LOU – W, 69–66
10.	Villanova	9–9.	21–11	1–1 vs. CONN/MARQ	#15 USF – L, 69–70				
11.	Marquette	9–9	20–14	1–2 vs. CONN/VILL	#14 PROV – W, 87–66	#6 WVU – W, 67–61	#3 LOU – L, 56–81		
12.	Seton Hall	7–11	13–18		#13 RUT – L, 70–76^{OT}				
13.	Rutgers	5–13	15–17		#12 HALL – W, 76–70^{OT}	#5 SJU – L, 63–65			
14.	Providence	4–14	15–17		#11 MARQ – L, 66–87				
15.	South Florida	3–14	10–23		#10 VILL – W, 70–69	#7 CIN – L, 61–87			
16.	DePaul	1–17	7–24		#9 CONN – L, 71–97				
‡ – Big East regular season champions, and tournament No. 1 seed. † – Received a double-bye in the conference tournament. # – Received a single-bye in the conference tournament. Overall records include all games played in the Big East tournament.

==== Highlights ====
- Connecticut won their first Big East tournament game in six years, by defeating DePaul, 97–71, in the first round. Their last win came in 2005 against Georgetown, 66–62, in the quarterfinals. In the six intervening losses, the Huskies were beaten three times by Syracuse, including a Big East record six-overtime, 127–117 decision in the 2009 quarterfinals.
- In a controversial finish to a second round game, St. John's defeated Rutgers, 65–63, allowing the Red Storm to advance to the quarterfinals for the first time since 2003. The final seconds of the game were heavily criticized by analysts, including the live ESPN crew, for a lack of officiating that appeared to hinder the Scarlet Knights' late rally, including two uncalled personal fouls against Red Storm players, and an incident in which St. John's forward Justin Brownlee appeared to prematurely celebrate by traveling, stepping out of bounds, and throwing the ball into the stands with more than a second remaining in the game. Rutgers' head coach Mike Rice Jr. could be seen screaming frantically for an explanation for the missed calls, while officials Jim Burr, Tim Higgins and Earl Walton had already left the court. At end of the game, ESPN analyst Doris Burke was quoted as saying, "this was the bizarrest ending of a game I've ever seen," and in a later post-game analysis that "the officials won't sleep tonight." Analyst Fran Fraschilla also added that the officiating "crew lost its composure." Following the game, the head of the NCAA's officiating arm, John Adams, who is in charge of selecting 98 officials for the NCAA tournament, called the lack of officiating "unacceptable," but would still consider the overall body of work of each official throughout the season to determine whether or not they would be invited to the tournament. Big East commissioner John Marinatto released a statement acknowledging "two separate officiating errors" that occurred at the end of the game, but conceded that "neither error is reviewable or correctable under NCAA playing rules." The following day, the conference announced that all three officials had voluntarily withdrawn themselves from the remainder of the tournament, which was, according to Marinatto, "in the best interests of everyone involved — including coaches, student-athletes, game officials and Big East member institutions."

=== NCAA tournament ===
At the finish of the regular season, prior to seeding for the 2011 NCAA Division I men's basketball tournament, it was widely speculated that the Big East would eclipse its NCAA record 8 bids, sending as many as 11 teams to the tournament. The official tournament selection process took place on Sunday, March 13, and the predictions were accurate, as the following 11 Big East teams received bids into the tournament:

Seed	Region	School	Round of 64	Round of 32	Sweet 16	Elite Eight	Final Four	Championship
3	West	Connecticut	#14 Bucknell – W, 81–52	#6 Cincinnati – W, 69–58	#2 San Diego State – W, 74–67	#5 Arizona – W, 65–63	#4 Kentucky – W, 56–55	#8 Butler – W, 53–41
11	East	Marquette	#6 Xavier – W, 66–55	#3 Syracuse – W, 66–62	#2 North Carolina – L, 81–63			
1	Southeast	Pittsburgh	#16 UNC-Asheville – W, 74–51	#8 Butler – L, 70–71				
2	Southwest	Notre Dame	#15 Akron – W, 69–56	#10 Florida State – L, 57–71				
3	East	Syracuse	#14 Indiana State – W, 77–60	#11 Marquette – L, 62–66				
5	East	West Virginia	#12 Clemson – W, 84–76	#4 Kentucky – L, 63–71				
6	West	Cincinnati	#11 Missouri – W, 78–63	#3 Connecticut – L, 58–69				
4	Southwest	Louisville	#13 Morehead State – L, 61–62					
6	Southeast	St. John's	#11 Gonzaga – L, 71–86					
6	Southwest	Georgetown	#11 VCU – L, 56–74					
9	East	Villanova	#8 George Mason – L, 57–61					
	11 Bids	W-L (%):	7–4 (.636)	2–5 (.286)	1–1 (.500)	1–0 (1.000)	1–0 (1.000)	TOTAL: 13–10 (.565)

After winning the 2011 Big East men's basketball tournament, Connecticut continued its winning streak all the way to the Final Four in Houston, Texas, defeating Butler in the national championship game for their third national title in school history. Connecticut guard Kemba Walker was named the tournament Most Outstanding Player. Fellow Connecticut guard Jeremy Lamb was also named to the Final Four All-Tournament team. In addition, Walker and Lamb were named to the West All-Regional team, the only Big East players to be named to an All-Region team in the tournament.

=== National Invitation tournament ===
No Big East teams were selected to play in the 2011 National Invitation Tournament.

== Rankings ==
Legend
	Improvement in ranking.
	Drop in ranking.
RV	Received votes, but were not ranked.
AP	AP Poll.
C	ESPN/USA Today Coaches Poll.

2010–11 Big East Conference Weekly Rankings
		Pre	Wk 1	Wk 2	Wk 3	Wk 4	Wk 5	Wk 6	Wk 7	Wk 8	Wk 9	Wk 10	Wk 11	Wk 12	Wk 13	Wk 14	Wk 15	Wk 16	Wk 17	Wk 18	FINAL
Cincinnati	AP				RV	RV	RV	RV	RV	24	25	25	RV	RV	RV			RV	25	RV	n/a
Cincinnati	C				RV		RV	RV	RV	25	RV	RV	RV						RV	RV	RV
Connecticut	AP	RV	RV	RV	7	6	4	4	4	8	10	8	5	6	10	13	14	16	21	9	n/a
Connecticut	C				9	6	4	4	4	9	9	8	5	7	9	12	15	16	19	8	1
DePaul	AP																				n/a
DePaul	C																				
Georgetown	AP	20	20	16	16	9	15	10	9	13	22	23	21	13	11	9	11	17	22	RV	n/a
Georgetown	C	21	21	16	14	10	13	9	9	13	19	23	20	14	11	9	11	17	22	25	RV
Louisville	AP			RV	RV	24	20	RV	22	RV	18	19	23	15	16	16	16	11	14	14	n/a
Louisville	C	RV		RV	RV	RV	21	25	20	23	17	15	19	13	15	16	16	11	14	11	22
Marquette	AP											RV		RV	RV	RV				RV	n/a
Marquette	C	RV	RV											RV	RV						20
Notre Dame	AP				25	23	24	22	15	14	9	16	15	9	8	8	9	8	4	5	n/a
Notre Dame	C				RV	23	23	20	15	15	11	16	14	8	7	7	9	7	4	6	14
Pittsburgh	AP	5	5	5	3	3	8	6	6	5	5	5	2	4	4	4	4	4	3	4	n/a
Pittsburgh	C	4	4	5	3	3	8	6	6	5	5	4	2	4	4	4	6	5	3	4	12
Providence	AP																				n/a
Providence	C																				
Rutgers	AP																				n/a
Rutgers	C																				
St. John's	AP										RV	RV		RV		RV	23	15	17	18	n/a
St. John's	C															RV	25	15	18	19	
Seton Hall	AP																				n/a
Seton Hall	C																				
South Florida	AP																				n/a
South Florida	C																				
Syracuse	AP	10	10	9	8	8	5	5	5	4	4	3	9	17	12	17	17	12	11	12	n/a
Syracuse	C	13	11	10	7	7	5	5	5	4	4	3	10	17	13	20	20	12	11	14	18
Villanova	AP	6	6	7	12	12	10	8	8	7	7	7	8	12	9	15	15	19	RV	RV	n/a
Villanova	C	6	7	7	12	12	11	8	8	7	7	7	7	12	10	14	14	19	RV		
West Virginia	AP	RV	RV	RV	RV		RV	RV	RV		RV	21	RV	25	25	RV	RV	RV	20	22	n/a
West Virginia	C	RV	RV	RV	RV	RV	RV	RV	RV		RV	RV	RV	RV	RV	RV	RV		RV	RV	RV

== Awards and honors ==
=== Conference awards and teams ===
The following individuals received postseason honors after having been chosen by the Big East Conference coaches.

2011 Big East Men's Basketball Individual Awards
Award	Recipient(s)
Player of the Year	Ben Hansbrough, G., NOTRE DAME
Coach of the Year	Mike Brey, NOTRE DAME
Defensive Player of the Year	Rick Jackson, F., SYRACUSE
Rookie of the Year	Cleveland Melvin, F., DePAUL
Scholar-Athlete of the Year	Tim Abromaitis, F., NOTRE DAME
Most Improved Player	Dwight Hardy, G., ST. JOHN'S
Sixth Man Award	Justin Burrell, F., ST. JOHN'S
Sportsmanship Award	Brad Wanamaker, G., PITTSBURGH

The Player of the Year, Coach of the Year, Rookie of the Year, and Scholar Athlete of the Year awards were announced on Tuesday, March 8, after the post-game interviews of the first session of the first round of the Big East tournament. The remainder of the individual awards were announced on Monday, March 7, while the All-Big East Men's Basketball Teams were announced on Sunday, March 6. Awardees are chosen by a simple ballot, in which coaches are not allowed to vote for their players or themselves (in the case of the Big East Coach of the Year). Coaches voted for Big East Player of the Year and Rookie of the Year from the first team and all-rookie lists, respectively.

Notre Dame senior guard Ben Hansbrough was named Player of the Year, and head coach Mike Brey was named Coach of the Year, after both leading the Fighting Irish to a surprising second-place finish in the conference regular season, with a record of 14–4. Hansbrough finished the regular season with a team-high 18.5 points per game, and was noted for his all-around quality of play, team leadership, and high efficiency shooting, including .492 field goal shooting, .451 from 3 point range, and .818 at the foul line. Fellow teammate Tim Abromaitis, a senior forward, received the Scholar Athlete of the Year award for the second year in a row, and was only the third player to receive the award in consecutive years.

Defensive Player of the Year Rick Jackson, a senior guard from Syracuse, was chosen for his shot-blocking and rebounding dominance, having led the Big East in both of these statistics during both the conference and non-conference season. This included a leading average of 10.7 rebounds per game, 7.2 defensive rebounds per game, and 2.5 blocks per game.

DePaul freshman forward Cleveland Melvin was named Rookie of the Year, after leading the Blue Demons in scoring, at 14.3 points per game, the highest average for a freshman in the league.

Other awardees included most improved player Dwight Hardy, who was credited with helping lead St. John's to a surprising resurgence in the conference, to a tie for third-place finish, with a conference fourth-best 17.9 points per game. Hardy's teammate Justin Burrell was also honored with the Sixth Man Award, for being key to the Red Storm's success, averaging 6.6 points on 51.1 percent shooting, 5.0 rebounds and 21.1 minutes off the bench. Finally, Pittsburgh senior guard Brad Wanamaker received the Sportsmanship Award for his all-around contribution to the team, as its captain, its leader in rebounds, assists, and steals (at 5.3, 5.2, and 1.5 per game, respectively), and its second-highest scorer (at 11.9 per game).

2011 All-Big East Men's Basketball Teams
First Team	Second Team	Third Team	Honorable Mention	All-Rookie Team
Kemba Walker, G., CONN; Austin Freeman, G., GTWN; Ben Hansbrough†, G., ND; Ashton Gibbs, G., PITT; Marshon Brooks, G/F., PROV; Dwight Hardy, G., SJU	Preston Knowles, G., LOU; Darius Johnson-Odom, G., MARQ; Brad Wanamaker, G., PITT; Rick Jackson, F., SYR; Corey Fisher, G., VILL	Chris Wright, G., GTWN; Tim Abromaitis, F., ND; Jeremy Hazell, G., HALL; Kris Joseph, F., SYR; Corey Stokes, G., VILL	Peyton Siva, G., LOU; Jimmy Butler, F., MARQ; Brandon Triche, G., SYR; Kevin Jones, G., WVU	Sean Kilpatrick, G., CIN; Jeremy Lamb, G., CONN; Shabazz Napier, G., CONN; Cleveland Melvin†, F., DEP; Brandon Young, G., DEP; Gilvydas Biruta, F., RUT
† - denotes unanimous selection

On the All-Big East Men's Basketball Teams, notable members of the first team included Hansbrough, Hardy, and Providence senior guard/forward Marshon Brooks, who were all given no all-conference consideration prior to the start of the season. Brooks led the conference in scoring, averaging 24.8 points per game, including a Big East single-game record 52 points in a loss to Notre Dame on February 23, 2010. On the All-Rookie Team, DePaul forward Cleveland Melvin was the only player to receive a unanimous selection. Notably absent from the list was Preseason Rookie of the Year Fab Melo, a center from Syracuse, who only averaged 9.4 minutes and 2.2 points off the bench.

=== National awards and teams ===
==== Players ====
Connecticut guard Kemba Walker was recognized as a consensus First Team All-American after being named to the first team All-American lists by the Associated Press, the USBWA, the NABC, and Sporting News. Notre Dame guard Ben Hansbrough was a consensus Second Team All-American after being named to the Second Team by all four selecting bodies. In addition, Providence forward Marshon Brooks was selected as a Third Team All-American by the Associated Press. Pittsburgh guard Brad Wanamaker, Syracuse forward Rick Jackson, St. John's guard Dwight Hardy, Georgetown guard Austin Freeman, and Pittsburgh guard Ashton Gibbs were all named Honorable Mention All-Americans by the Associated Press.

Walker was also selected as the winner of the Bob Cousy Award for the nation's best point guard, and won the second-ever Lute Olson Award for the most outstanding non-freshman in the nation.

For the second consecutive year, Notre Dame senior forward Tim Abromaitis was named to the men's basketball Academic All-America First Team, by CoSIDA and ESPN The Magazine. A graduate student, Abromaitis was pursuing an MBA, specializing in finance, and achieved a 3.72 GPA during his penultimate season with the Fighting Irish.

===== Award finalists =====
On March 14, the Wooden Award final ballot was released, and included four Big East players. The list was composed of 20 players, reduced from the midseason list of 30. St. John's guard Dwight Hardy and Notre Dame guard Ben Hansbrough were newcomers to the list, while three Big East players who were on the midseason list did not appear on the final ballot: Austin Freeman, Rick Jackson, and Brad Wanamaker. On March 20, Kemba Walker was named one of four finalists for the Naismith Award.

	Wooden	Naismith
Marshon Brooks, PROV	✓	
Ben Hansbrough, ND	✓	
Dwight Hardy, SJU	✓	
Kemba Walker, CONN	✓	✓

BYU guard Jimmer Fredette was chosen as both the 2011 Wooden Award and 2011 Naismith Award recipient.

==== Coaches ====
Notre Dame head coach Mike Brey was named the Associated Press Coach of the Year, and was selected for the Henry Iba Award by the USBWA.

== See also ==
- 2010–11 NCAA Division I men's basketball season
- 2010–11 Cincinnati Bearcats men's basketball team
- 2010–11 Connecticut Huskies men's basketball team
- 2010–11 Georgetown Hoyas men's basketball team
- 2010–11 Louisville Cardinals men's basketball team
- 2010–11 Marquette Golden Eagles men's basketball team
- 2010–11 Notre Dame Fighting Irish men's basketball team
- 2010–11 Pittsburgh Panthers men's basketball team
- 2010–11 Providence Friars men's basketball team
- 2010–11 St. John's Red Storm men's basketball team
- 2010–11 South Florida Bulls men's basketball team
- 2010–11 Syracuse Orange men's basketball team
- 2010–11 Villanova Wildcats men's basketball team
- 2010–11 West Virginia Mountaineers men's basketball team
