= 2010–11 Georgetown Hoyas men's basketball team =

American college basketball season

2010–11 Georgetown Hoyas men's basketball

Charleston Classic Champions

NCAA tournament, Round of 64
- Conference: Big East Conference
- Record: 21–11 (10–8 Big East)
- Head coach: John Thompson III (7th season)
- Assistant coaches: Kenya Hunter (4th season); Mike Brennan (2nd season); Robert Kirby (1st season)
- Captains: Austin Freeman; Chris Wright; Ryan Dougherty
- Home arena: Verizon Center

The 2010–11 Georgetown Hoyas men's basketball team represented Georgetown University in the 2010–2011 NCAA Division I basketball season. In November, the team played in and won the Charleston Classic tournament. During the February 23 game against the Cincinnati Bearcats, senior Chris Wright injured his hand, and later had surgery that kept him out of the final conference games. Without him, the Hoyas lost in their first game in the 2011 Big East men's basketball tournament. The team ultimately received an at-large invitation as a 6 seed in the 2011 NCAA Division I men's basketball tournament, where they lost in the second round to VCU. They finished the season 21–11, 10–8 in Big East play.

== Previous season ==
2010–11 Big East men's basketball standings
	Conf.				Overall
Team	W		L	PCT	W		L	PCT
No. 4 Pittsburgh	15	–	3	.833	28	–	6	.824
No. 5 Notre Dame	14	–	4	.778	27	–	7	.794
*No. 12 Syracuse	12	–	6	.667	27	–	8	.771
No. 14 Louisville	12	–	6	.667	25	–	10	.714
No. 18 St. John's	12	–	6	.667	21	–	12	.636
Cincinnati	11	–	7	.611	26	–	9	.743
No. 22 West Virginia	11	–	7	.611	21	–	12	.636
Georgetown	10	–	8	.556	21	–	11	.656
No. 9 Connecticut†	9	–	9	.500	32	–	9	.780
Villanova	9	–	9	.500	21	–	12	.636
Marquette	9	–	9	.500	22	–	15	.595
Seton Hall	7	–	11	.389	13	–	18	.419
Rutgers	5	–	13	.278	15	–	17	.469
Providence	4	–	14	.222	15	–	17	.469
South Florida	3	–	15	.167	10	–	23	.303
DePaul	1	–	17	.056	7	–	24	.226
† 2011 Big East tournament winner As of April 4, 2011; *Syracuse:: 7 wins vacated due to sanctions against the program; Disputed record: Syracuse–(27–8)(10–6); Rankings from AP Poll

In their previous season, the team finished the season 23–11, and 10–8 in Big East play, and advanced to the championship game of the 2010 Big East men's basketball tournament. Sophomore Greg Monroe declined to return, and entered the NBA draft where he was selected by the Detroit Pistons.

== Season recap ==
Although star center Greg Monroe had opted to forego his senior year of college and enter the 2010 National Basketball Association draft after the end of the previous season and reserve guard Stephan Stepka had transferred to James Madison, the Hoyas returned the rest of the core and reserve players of their 2009–10 team. Senior Julian Vaughn and sophomore Hollis Thompson at forward and seniors Austin Freeman and Chris Wright and sophomore Jason Clark at guard all returned as starters or major contributors off the bench. Sophomore Vee Sanford also returned as a reserve guard, sophomore Jerrelle Benimon as a reserve forward, and junior Henry Sims as a reserve center. Freshmen joining the Hoyas for the season included guard Markel Starks, who later would emerge as their point guard, forwards Nate Lubick and Aaron Bowen, and center Moses Ayegba. Freshman guard John Caprio also made the team as a walk-on. Ranked No. 20 in the Associated Press Poll to start the season, Georgetown hoped for another successful campaign in 2010–2011, and to return to the NCAA tournament for the fifth time in six seasons. The Hoyas also hoped for a deeper run in the tournament, which they had exited in the first weekend of play in their last two appearances in 2008 and 2010.

=== Non-conference schedule ===
Georgetown began the season with six straight wins over unranked opponents. In their season opener, at Old Dominion, they broke the Monarchs′ 23-game home winning streak – the fourth-longest active streak in the United States, dating back to January 2009 – behind 19 points by Chris Wright, 18 by Jason Clark, and 17 by Austin Freeman. Following a win in their home opener over Tulane in which Freeman scored 23 points, Jason Clark had a double-double with 17 points and 11 rebounds, and Vee Sanford contributed 10 points off the bench, the Hoyas traveled to Charleston, South Carolina, to take part in the Charleston Classic as its only ranked team. As NASCAR driver and former Hoya player Brendan Gaughan looked on from the stands, they won the opener against Coastal Carolina, with Clark scoring 22 points, Freeman scoring 20, and Chris Wright getting a double-double with 12 points and 12 rebounds. They followed this with a semifinal win over Wofford in which Julian Vaughn had a double-double with 12 points and 10 rebounds, Chris Wright had a game-high 18 points, and Austin Freeman scored 14, and a victory in the final game over North Carolina State to win the tournament. In the championship game, the Hoya starters had a balanced attack against the Wolfpack, with Hollis Thompson scoring a game-high 18 points, Wright 17, Freeman 15, and Clark 14. Ranked No. 16 in the AP Poll, the Hoyas then returned to the Verizon Center, where Freeman tied a school record shared by Mark Tillmon and Darrel Owens by hitting seven three-pointers, going 7-for-9 (77.7%) from three-point range, and scored 32 points in a win over UNC Asheville. Julian Vaughn scored 16 points against the Bulldogs, and Jason Clark had a double-double with 11 points and 10 rebounds.

With a record of 6–0, Georgetown next faced its first ranked opponent of the season, unbeaten No. 9 Missouri, in a game at the Sprint Center in Kansas City, Missouri. The Hoyas started strong, hitting seven of their first eight shots to take a 14–9 lead with 16:24 left in the first half. They then went on a 14–4 run to pull out to a 23–13 lead with 11:33 left in the half, and followed with a 9–0 run to stretch their lead to 35–17 with 8:53 left. Missouri followed with an 8–2 run of its own, but at the end of it Georgetown still led 38–25, having shot 15-for-19 (79.0%) from the field. At the half, Georgetown had shot 20-for-28 (71.4%) from the field and still led 54–47, but the Tigers were in the midst of a comeback that continued into the second half and, with 8:25 to left to play in regulation, took their first lead of the game, 77–75, on a three-pointer by junior guard Marcus Denmon. Vee Sanford responded with a three-pointer of his own that put the Hoyas back in front, 78–77, with 7:49 left. Sophomore point guard Michael Dixon scored on a layup to take the lead back for Missouri, and the Tigers moved out to an 85–80 advantage with 4:21 to play. After a Georgetown timeout, Austin Freeman scored five consecutive points on a free throw and two layups to tie the game at 85–85 with 3:35 to go. The teams continued to trade baskets until Dixon sank two free throws with 26 seconds left to give Missouri a 93–89 lead. After Chris Wright also sank two free throws to close to 93–91, Dixon hit the first of two free throws to give Missouri a 94–91 lead with 14.1 seconds remaining in regulation, but missed the second, and Wright responded with a three-pointer with one second left that tied the game at 94–94 and forced overtime. In overtime, the score stood at 98–98 when Georgetown went on a 9–2 run thanks to Jason Clark – who until then had gone 1-for-6 from beyond the three-point line – hitting three straight three-pointers, giving the Hoyas a 107–100 lead with 1:22 remaining, and Georgetown hung on to secure a 111–102 upset overtime win and a 7–0 start for the second consecutive season. Austin Freeman scored 31 points, his second straight game with more than 30 points, while Jason Clark had 26, Chris Wright had a double-double with 21 points and 10 assists, and Henry Sims came off the bench to score 10 points. The Hoyas shot 18-for-18 from the free throw line and hit 15 three-pointers, and their 111 points were the most Missouri had allowed since a 111–56 defeat at the hands of Kansas State on January 3, 1998.

The Hoyas returned to the Verizon Center for a win over Utah State in which Chris Wright finished with a game-high 21 points and four steals, and Georgetown improved to 8–0 for the second straight season. By the time they visited Temple five days later, the Hoyas had risen to No. 9 in the AP Poll, but behind a 30-point performance by junior guard Ramone Moore Temple upset Georgetown to give Owls head coach Fran Dunphy his 400th career victory and end the Hoyas′ winning streak despite 15 points by Jason Clark, 14 each by Austin Freeman and Julian Vaughn, and 10 by Chris Wright. Back at the Verizon Center, Georgetown had two easy wins, defeating first Appalachian State and then Loyola of Maryland. Jason Clark finished with 15 points and Austin Freeman with 14 against Appalachian States, while Nate Lubick and Hollis Thompson each scored 11 points and Chris Wright had 12 assists in the game. As two Georgetown students wearing biblical clothing and long false beards held up a "Free Moses" sign, freshman center Moses Ayegba – ruled ineligible for Georgetown's first nine games because he had received an airline ticket to the United States from his native Nigeria from a non-family member – made his collegiate debut in the Appalachian State game, scoring two points. Against Loyola six days later, Austin Freeman and Hollis Thompson each scored 14 points, Henry Sims contributed 12, and Chris Wright added 11.

Falling to No. 15 in the AP Poll by the time of the Loyola game, Georgetown rose again to No. 10 by the time it rounded out its non-conference schedule with a visit to No. 16 Memphis, its second ranked opponent of the season. From the field, the Hoyas shot 52 percent in the first half, 63 percent in the second half, and 57 percent for the game, committing only six turnovers, and emerged as the second-best shooting team in the United States in field goal percentage for the season at 52.5 percent. Georgetown held an early lead, but the game remained close, and Memphis took the lead at 15–14 with 13:30 remaining in the first half. The Tigers extended this to their largest lead of the game, 22–18, with 10:00 until halftime, but the Hoyas regained the advantage at 24–22 with 8:41 to play in the half and never trailed again. Leading 40–36 at halftime, the Hoyas pulled away in the second half, leading 76–59 with 3:37 left in the game and winning 89–69. Austin Freeman led the team with a game-high 24 points, while Chris Wright added 19 and Julian Vaughn had a double-double with 15 points and 10 rebounds.

=== Conference schedule ===
The 11–1 Hoyas were back to No. 9 in the AP Poll when they began their Big East season on December 29 with their second straight road game against a ranked opponent, facing No. 15 Notre Dame at South Bend, Indiana. The Hoyas entered the game as the fourth-best three-point-shooting team in the United States, but a strong defensive effort by the underdog Fighting Irish held Georgetown to only 4-for-22 (18.2%) from three-point range and also limited the offensive output of Chris Wright (3 points) and Jason Clark (8 points); Austin Freeman had a 21-point game, but as a team Georgetown shot only 42.6 percent from the field. The Fighting Irish also enjoyed a big advantage from the free-throw line, going 22-for-27 to the Hoyas′ 5-for-9. The game was close for about the first 10 minutes, but then the Fighting Irish went on an 8–0 run that gave them the lead for good at 23–15 with 7:35 left until halftime. In the second half, a 14–2 Fighting Irish run gave Notre Dame a 48–32 lead with 11:55 left in the game. The Hoyas responded with a 9–0 run of their own that closed the gap to 48–41 with 8:16 left, but two Fighting Irish three-pointers followed that pushed their lead to 56–43. A layup and two free throws by Freeman got the Hoyas′ deficit to single digits at 56–47 with 3:53 to play, but Notre Dame then extended its lead again and upset the Hoyas, winning 69–55. It was the first time that Georgetown had lost its Big East opener during John Thompson III's tenure, breaking a 7–0 Georgetown winning streak in conference openers since Thompson's first season with the team 2004–05.

Returning to Washington to play their first New Year's Day game since 1943, the Hoyas defeated the Big East's weakest team, DePaul, in DePaul's first New Year's Day game since at least 1945 and dealt the Blue Demons their 10th consecutive loss to Georgetown, 15th consecutive loss to a Big East opponent, and 25th consecutive road loss, with Austin Freeman and Jason Clark each scoring 21 points, Chris Wright emerging in the second half from a shooting slump to contribute 17, and Julian Vaughn pulling down 10 rebounds and adding nine points. The season then took its first real downturn. Falling to No. 13 in the AP Poll after the win over DePaul, the Hoyas lost first at Madison Square Garden to St. John's in the last few seconds of a close game in which Hollis Thompson scored 16 points but Clark, Freeman, and Wright combined for only 20, and then at the Verizon Center to West Virginia, with Clark scoring 16 and Freeman 11 but the Mountaineers making up for poor shooting by dominating in offensive rebounds (15–4) and free throw attempts (24–11) and forcing the Hoyas into 18 turnovers.

Dropping to No. 22 in the AP Poll and, at 1–3 in conference play, off to its worst start in the Big East since the 2003–04 season – Craig Esherick′s last as head coach – Georgetown next hosted No. 5 Pittsburgh, the winners of five straight games. The Hoyas never led in the game, and their slumping backcourt of Clark, Freeman, and Wright could not compete with the perimeter shooters of the Panthers. The Hoyas also slumped at the free-throw line, making only 4 of 14 foul shots (28.6%) in the first half – to the boos of the crowd – and 14 of 25 (56.0%) in the game. Freeman and Wright got in early foul trouble, and Pittsburgh jumped out to a 19–9 advantage with 10:54 remaining in the first half and led by double digits for the rest of the game. Wright and Freeman finally began to score in the second half, and Wright led the Hoyas with 14 points, while Julian Vaughn had 13 and Freeman scored 12. Georgetown never went on a run greater than 4–0 until late in the second half, when they scored seven unanswered points to cut Pittsburgh's lead from 18 to 11 points with 5:32 to play, but the Panthers pulled away again and cruised to a 72–57 victory. Although the Hoyas ended the game leading the Big East in field-goal percentage at 50.9%, the loss was Georgetown's third in a row, and left them with a 1–4 Big East record, their worst start in the conference since 1998–99, the season in which John Thompson Jr. had resigned as head coach.

After the Pittsburgh game, the Hoya backcourt pulled out of its slump, and a new winning streak began with victories at Rutgers – the Scarlet Knights' ninth loss in their previous 10 games against Georgetown – and Seton Hall and in a rematch with St. John's at the Verizon Center, dealing each opponent its fifth loss in six games and, in the case of St. John's, extending the Red Storm's string of consecutive road losses against ranked teams to 32, dating back to 2002. Austin Freeman had 25 points and a career-high nine rebounds against Rutgers, 28 points at Seton Hall, and 14 points in the one-sided win over St. John's, while Chris Wright finished with 15 points at Rutgers and 17 at Seton Hall. Jason Clark scored 13 points at Rutgers and 16 against St. John's, while Hollis Thompson contributed 14 points at Seton Hall and 15 against St. John's. Julian Vaughn scored 11 at Seton Hall, and Nate Lubick made his first collegiate start in the St. John's game, committing four turnovers but scoring six points. Georgetown entered the Seton Hall game with the third-highest team field-goal percentage in the United States, at 50.7 percent. The Hoyas dropped to No. 23 in the AP Poll before the Seton Hall game, but climbed to No. 21 in time for the game against St. John's, and the three wins evened their Big East record at 4–4.

Second in the United States in team field-goal percentage at 50.8 percent, the Hoyas next traveled to Philadelphia, Pennsylvania, to face No. 8 Villanova at the Wells Fargo Center. Georgetown fell behind the Wildcats early, trailing 10–5 with 16:24 to play in the first half, but then came back to post a 32–26 lead at halftime. The Hoyas more or less held that lead until the Wildcats began a surge with 2:53 to play and closed to only a 61–60 deficit with 2:08 left. The Hoyas then got the ball to Austin Freeman repeatedly; he made a two-point layup to increase Georgetown's lead to 63–60 with 1:39 left, then, after Villanova sophomore guard Maalik Wayns made two free throws, hit a two-point jumper to extend Georgetown's lead to 65–62. After two more Wayns free throws, a dunk by Nate Lubick, and a layup by Wayns made the score Georgetown 67 Villanova 66, Freeman sank two free throws to secure a 69–66 upset victory for the Hoyas. Freeman went 8-for-8 in free throws and scored 10 of Georgetown's last 12 points on the way to a 30-point game, while Jason Clark scored 10 points, and Julian Vaughn went 7-for-7 from the free-throw line in a 9-point performance.

With a winning conference record (5–4) for the first time in the season, Georgetown rose to No. 13 in the AP Poll and returned home to face No. 15 Louisville, the Hoyas′ second ranked conference opponent in two days. Both teams had a lackluster first half; the Hoyas shot 31 percent from the field, the Cardinals shot 26 percent, the teams had a combined 12 turnovers before they scored a combined 12 points (on the way to having 16 turnovers each before the game was over) and at the half the score was Georgetown 22 Louisville 18. In the second half, however, the Georgetown offense came alive; the Hoyas went on a 10–2 run to take a 34–25 lead with 16:31 left to play, but the Cardinals went on a 15–4 run of their own to tie the game at 47–47 with 7:56 remaining. After that, the game remained tight, but the Hoyas shot 13-for-17 (76%) from the field in the second half and hung on to win 72–69, extending their winning streak to five games. Chris Wright, who had not scored a single point in the Villanova game, went 8-for-8 from in free throws and scored a game-high 24 against Louisville, including two free throws with five seconds left to help clinch the victory. Austin Freeman saw his streak of 23 consecutive free throws end but nonetheless had 13 points, and Julian Vaughn added 10. Five days later, the Hoyas stretched their winning streak to six, holding off Providence despite a 43-point game – fifth-highest ever in a Big East game at the time – by Providence senior guard-forward Marshon Brooks. Freeman scored 23 points against the Friars, while Jason Clark contributed 18, Chris Wright added 16, and Julian Vaughn had a double-double with 14 points and a career-high 11 rebounds.

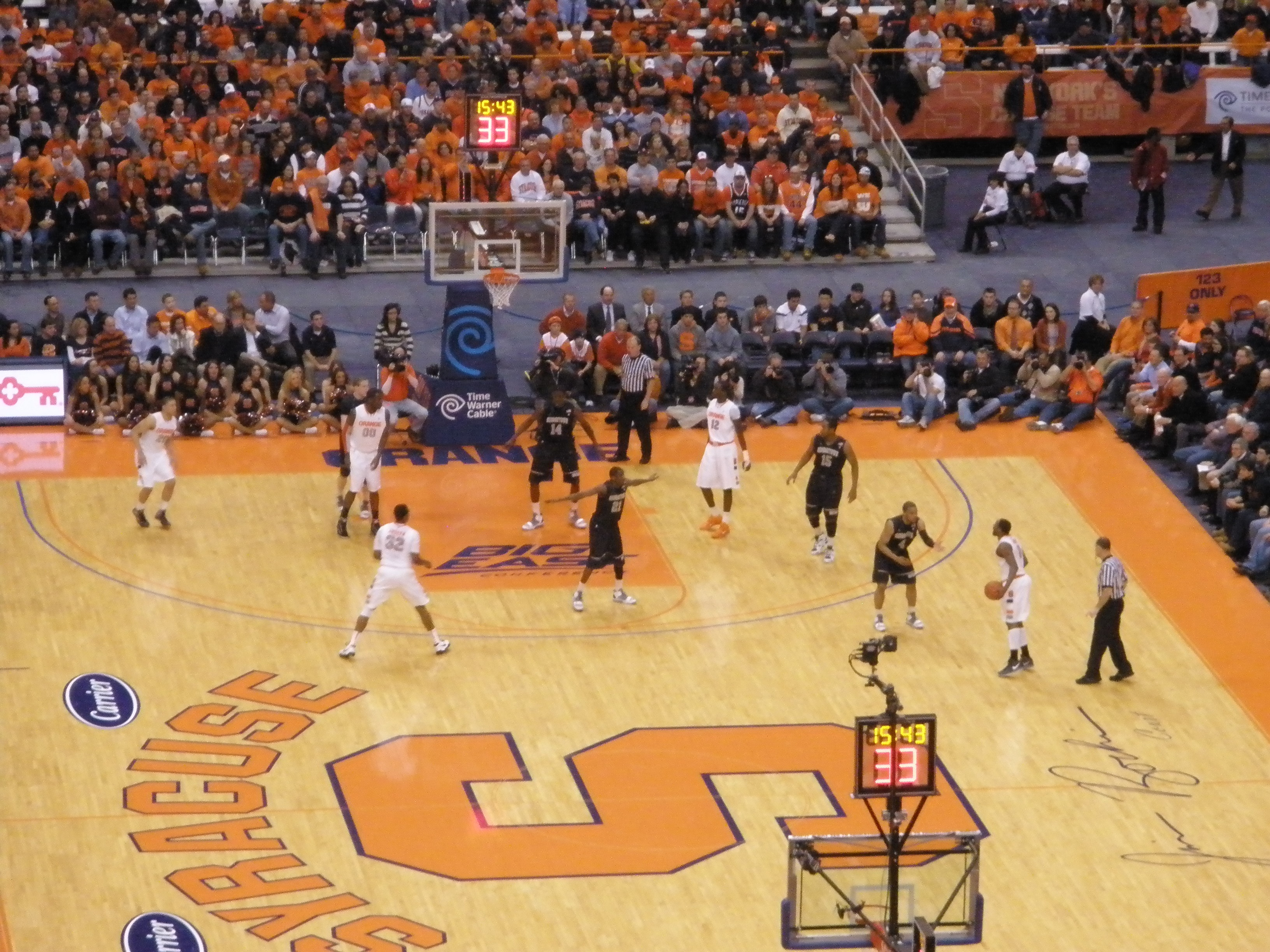
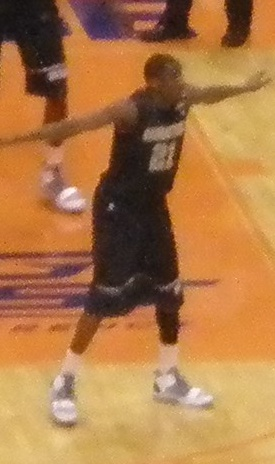
LEFT: Georgetown playing at Syracuse on February 9, 2011. RIGHT: Jason Clark on the court during the game.

Georgetown was No. 11 in the AP Poll and ranked second in the United States in team field goal percentage at 50.5 percent when it went on the road for a game at No. 12 Syracuse, its third ranked conference opponent in four games. The Hoyas got out to a 16–10 lead halfway through the first half, but Syracuse responded with a 13–2 run, and at halftime the Orange led 31–29. Syracuse extended the lead to 37–31, but the Hoyas rallied to pull ahead 39–38. Then a key Syracuse player, senior forward Rick Jackson, went to the bench with four fouls with 14:40 left to play, and the Orange had to play with three freshmen on the court. Georgetown extended its lead to 44–40, but Syracuse overcame Jackson's absence to battle its way back into the lead, and the Orange were ahead 51–47 with 9:00 left in the game. Syracuse clung to its lead until 3:50 was left, when Hollis Thompson sank a three-pointer to tie the game at 55–55 and begin what turned out to be a decisive 9–0 Georgetown run that put the Hoyas ahead 61–55 with 2:08 remaining. Georgetown went on to win 64–56, having held the Orange to 39.6 shooting from the field and 4-for-16 (25%) in three-pointers. It was John Thompson III's first win at the Carrier Dome in six tries, and the Orange's third straight home less, only the third time that had happened in Jim Boeheim′s 35-year tenure as Syracuse's head coach. Four days later, Georgetown extended its winning streak to eight – the Hoyas's longest conference winning streak since the 2006–07 season – and won its 20th game of the season, coming from behind to defeat Marquette at the Verizon Center in a match-up of the two top-shooting teams in the Big East. Austin Freeman injured his ankle with 1:13 left in the first half of the game against the Golden Eagles, but returned in the second half and played through pain to finish with 17 points. Chris Wright had 20 points, and Hollis Thompson pulled down a career-high 13 rebounds.

In third place in the Big East and rising to No. 9 in the AP Poll, the Hoyas went on the road to play another ranked team, No. 12 Connecticut, three days later. The Hoyas led 37–36 at the half and 70–69 with 4:01 left in the game, but did not score again as Connecticut finished the game with nine unanswered points, and the Huskies upset the Hoyas 78–70. Chris Wright led the Hoyas with 19 points, while Jason Clark had 13 and Austin Freeman 12, and Hollis Thompson came off the bench to score 10. With their eight-game winning streak broken, the Hoyas visited South Florida and beat the Bulls behind Chris Wright's season-high 26 points, including 8-for-8 from the free-throw line and six free throws in the final 29.7 seconds of play, and 10 points by Jason Clark. It turned out to be Georgetown's last victory of the season.

Georgetown had fallen to No. 11 in the AP Poll when its season-ending losing streak began at the Verizon Center with an upset loss to Cincinnati, breaking the Bearcats′ 20-game losing streak on the road to ranked teams that dated back to January 14, 2004. Although Austin Freeman scored 19 points, the Hoyas shot 25 percent from the field as a team, their worst shooting performance since at least the 1996–97 season. Bigger than the loss of the game was the loss of Chris Wright, who left the game with a broken hand with 15:53 left to play. Wright was unable to play – breaking his 93-game collegiate starting streak – when Georgetown hosted No. 17 Syracuse in a rematch with former President Bill Clinton, former Georgetown and National Basketball Association star Alonzo Mourning, and Washington Capitals and Washington Wizards owner Ted Leonsis looking on. Syracuse was ahead for almost the entire first half, finishing with a 9–2 run that gave the Orange a 33–23 lead at halftime. Georgetown battled back in the second half to take a 45–43 lead with 10:00 left to play, but from there Syracuse outscored the Hoyas 15–6 for a 58–51 upset win. Austin Freeman had 16 points and Jason Clark scored 11. With Wright – who had undergone surgery on his hand – still out and the Hoyas falling to No. 17 in the AP Poll, the season ended with a loss at Cincinnati, in which Freeman alone provided most of Georgetown's offense, playing 37 minutes and scoring 21 points. Both teams were shooting only 33 percent from the floor with 10 minutes left to play, and Georgetown, although leading the Big East with a team field goal percentage of 48.5, shot only 32 percent from the field against Cincinnati. Hollis Thompson had 12 points.

=== Big East tournament ===
Georgetown finished the regular season in eighth place in the Big East with a 10–8 conference record. As the number eight seed in the 2011 Big East tournament, the Hoyas earned a bye in the first round. In the second round – now ranked No. 22 in the AP Poll after their season-ending losing streak – they faced the ninth seed, No. 21 Connecticut. Like Georgetown, the Huskies had struggled late in the regular season, losing four of their final five games, but they had defeated 16th-seed DePaul the previous day in the first round of the tournament to advance to face the Hoyas. Chris Wright's injured hand forced him to sit out again. The game was tied at 15–15 halfway through the first half, but with Georgetown in early foul trouble, Connecticut embarked on a 22–7 run to take a 37–22 advantage with 3:36 left in the first half, and the Huskies led 42–30 at halftime. With the Georgetown backcourt shooting a combined 2-for-13 (15.4%), Julian Vaugh held scoreless, and Connecticut junior guard Kemba Walker scoring 28 points, the Huskies cruised through the second half to knock Georgetown out of the tournament with a 79–62 win. Jason Clark led the Hoyas with 23 points, Austin Freeman had 20, and Hollis Thompson scored 10.

=== NCAA tournament ===
Losers of four straight, No. 22 Georgetown nonetheless had a 21–10 record that was good enough to earn the Hoyas a bid in the 2011 NCAA tournament, their second consecutive appearance in the tournament and fifth in six seasons. Seeded sixth in the Southwest Region, in the Round of 64 – termed the "Second Round" of the tournament that year – they met 11th-seeded VCU, which had lost five of its last eight games prior to the tournament but had defeated USC in the "First Four" round to advance to play the Hoyas. Chris Wright finally returned to play, raising hopes that the Hoyas could pull out of their slump and make a run in the tournament, but Wright shot 3-for-13 and finished with only six points. The Hoyas led 19–18 with 7:48 left in the first half, but the Rams then went on a 9–0 run to take a lead they never relinquished. VCU led 35–24 at halftime, and in the second half continued to extend their lead, beginning with a 14–4 run that put them ahead 49–28 with about 15 minutes left to play. Georgetown closed to 49–34 with 13:51 remaining, but never threatened the Rams′ lead. The Hoyas committed 17 turnovers against only six for the Rams, and shot only 5-for-26 (19.2%) from three-point range — with Freeman, Wright, and Clark combining for 0-for-16 in three-point attempts – while VCU made 12 of 25 attempted three-pointers (48.0%). Despite 26 points off the bench by Hollis Thompson and 10 points by Austin Freeman, VCU went on to win 74–56 in a shocking upset, dealing the Hoyas their most lopsided NCAA tournament defeat since an 86–62 loss to Massachusetts in 1996. It was the first time VCU had ever won more than one game in an NCAA tournament, and the Rams went all the way to the Final Four before they were eliminated. For the Hoyas, it was their third straight NCAA tournament elimination in the tournament's first weekend, and the second consecutive year that they had been knocked out in their first game.

=== Wrap-up ===
Starting all 32 games, Austin Freeman finished the season with a team-leading 17.6 points per game, having shot 47.6 percent from the field and a team-best 87.0 percent from the free-throw line. Chris Wright, who missed three late games because of his hand injury, started in all 29 of his appearances and scored 12.9 points per game – second best on the team – on 41.4 percent shooting from the field and 78.3 percent in free throws. Jason Clark, starting every game, finished with a field-goal percentage of 48.3, a free-throw percentage of 77.0, and 12.0 points per game. Shooting 51.9 percent from three-point range – best on the team – Hollis Thompson appeared in all 32 games, starting 22 of them, and also had a team-best 51.9 percent average in field goals overall and averaged 8.6 points per game. Julian Vaughn, who missed one game but started the other 31, was second-best for the season in field goal percentage at 49.4 and averaged 7.8 points, and he led the Hyas with 6.1 rebounds per game. Other players seeing significant playing time were Jerrelle Benimon, Nate Lubick, and Henry Sims, all of whom played in every game, and Markel Starks, who saw action in 30 games. Lubick started in 13 of his appearances, while Sims started one game.

After the season, a major turnover occurred on Georgetown's roster. Mainstays Austin Freeman, Julian Vaughn, and Chris Wright all graduated in 2011, as did reserve guard Ryan Dougherty. Freeman left after a 129-game collegiate career in which he had started 117 times, shot 49.8 percent from the field, and averaged 13.7 points per game. In his 110 games, 94 of them starts, Wright had averaged 12.4 points per game on 45.9 percent shooting from the field, while Vaughn completed his career after a freshman year at Florida State and three years at Georgetown with a combined 126 games played (95 at Georgetown), 72 starts (65 at Georgetown), and 5.1 points per game with a 52.5 percent field-goal percentage, although during his three years at Georgetown he averaged 5.8 points per game on 52.7 percent shooting. Freeman, Vaughn, and Wright all went undrafted in the 2011 NBA draft; all three played professional basketball overseas and, during a three-day stint with the Dallas Mavericks in March 2013, Wright became the first person to play in the National Basketball Association after being diagnosed with multiple sclerosis.

On May 19, 2011, sophomore guard Vee Sanford announced that he was transferring to Dayton, where, after fulfilling a requirement to sit out the 2011–12 season, he could begin play with the Flyers in 2012–13 with two years of college eligibility remaining. Sanford became the eleventh Hoya player in six seasons to leave Georgetown prior to the expiration of his college eligibility. Hollis Thompson initially declared for the 2011 NBA draft, indicating that he planned to forego his final two years of college eligibility, but he never hired an agent and instead returned to school to play for Georgetown the following season.

Although among the top-shooting teams in the United States during the season, the Hoyas had finished the year with a five-game losing streak. They clearly missed the injured Chris Wright during that stretch, but their backcourt also slumped in the final games of the year, especially from three-point range, and that had torpedoed their hopes of advancing in both the Big East tournament and the NCAA tournament. The season also ended in a sloppy, off-target performance against VCU, a loss which left Georgetown with no NCAA tournament victories since the first game of the 2008 tournament despite three appearances in four years over that stretch. It continued a troubling pattern established since their Final Four appearance in 2007 of early upsets in the NCAA tournament at the hands of decided underdogs. That pattern would continue the following season.

The 2010–11 Hoyas finished with a record of 21–11. In the Top 25 of the AP Poll all season, they finished the year ranked No. 22 – their lowest rank of the year – in a final poll taken on March 7, before their losses in the Big East and NCAA tournaments. Although they had also been in the Coaches Poll Top 25 for almost the entire season, they finished the year unranked in that poll's postseason voting on March 29, which followed the two tournament losses.

== Roster ==
2010–11 Georgetown Hoyas men's basketball team
Players
Coaches

Pos.	#	Name	Height	Weight	Year	Previous school	Hometown
F	1	Hollis Thompson	6 ft 7 in (2.01 m)	205 lb (93 kg)	So	Loyola High School	Concord, California
G	4	Chris Wright	6 ft 1 in (1.85 m)	208 lb (94 kg)	Sr	St. John's College High School	Bowie, Maryland
G	5	Markel Starks	6 ft 2 in (1.88 m)	175 lb (79 kg)	Fr	Georgetown Preparatory School	Accokeek, Maryland
G	11	Vee Sanford	6 ft 3 in (1.91 m)	180 lb (82 kg)	So	Lexington Catholic High School	Lexington, Kentucky
G	12	Ryan Dougherty	6 ft 0 in (1.83 m)	192 lb (87 kg)	Sr	St. Albans School	Kensington, Maryland
C	14	Henry Sims	6 ft 10 in (2.08 m)	226 lb (103 kg)	Jr	Mount Saint Joseph College	Baltimore, Maryland
G	15	Austin Freeman	6 ft 3.5 in (1.92 m)	227 lb (103 kg)	Sr	DeMatha Catholic High School	Mitchellville, Maryland
F	20	Jerrelle Benimon	6 ft 7 in (2.01 m)	242 lb (110 kg)	So	Fauquier High School	Warrenton, Virginia
G	21	Jason Clark	6 ft 2 in (1.88 m)	170 lb (77 kg)	Jr	Bishop O'Connell High School	Arlington, Virginia
F	22	Julian Vaughn	6 ft 9 in (2.06 m)	250 lb (113 kg)	Sr	Oak Hill Academy	Vienna, Virginia
F	23	Aaron Bowen (injured)	6 ft 6 in (1.98 m)	200 lb (91 kg)	Fr	Samuel W. Wolfson High School	Jacksonville, Florida
G	25	John Caprio	6 ft 5.5 in (1.97 m)	210 lb (95 kg)	Fr	Seton Hall Preparatory School	North Caldwell, New Jersey
C	32	Moses Ayegba	6 ft 8.5 in (2.04 m)	250 lb (113 kg)	Fr	Progressive Christian Academy	Kano, Nigeria
F	34	Nate Lubick	6 ft 8.5 in (2.04 m)	238 lb (108 kg)	Fr	St. Mark's School	Southborough, Massachusetts

Head coach

John Thompson III

Assistant coach(es)

Kenya Hunter
Mike Brennan
Robert Kirby

Legend

- (C) Team captain
- (S) Suspended
- (I) Ineligible
- (W) Walk-on
- Injured
- Current redshirt

Roster
Last update: December 6, 2010

== Rankings ==
Ranking movements Legend: ██ Increase in ranking ██ Decrease in ranking RV = Received votes
	Week																		
Poll	Pre	2	3	4	5	6	7	8	9	10	11	12	13	14	15	16	17	18	Post
AP	(Note: No Associated Press Poll this week.)	20	16	16	9	15	10	9	13	22	23	21	13	11	9	11	17	22	
Coaches	21	21	16	14	10	13	9	9	13	19	23	20	14	11	9	11	17	22	RV

== Schedule ==
Date time, TV	Rank^{#}	Opponent^{#}	Result	Record	Site (attendance) city, state
Regular season
November 12*; 7:00 pm, Comcast	No. 20	at Old Dominion	W 62–59	1–0	Constant Convocation Center (8,457); Norfolk, Virginia
November 15*; 7:00 pm	No. 20	Tulane	W 69–53	2–0	Verizon Center (10,031); Washington, D.C.
November 18*; 12:00 pm, MASN	No. 20	vs. Coastal Carolina; Charleston Classic first round	W 80–61	3–0	Carolina First Arena (1,977); Charleston, South Carolina
November 19*; 2:30 pm, ESPNU	No. 20	vs. Wofford; Charleston Classic semi-finals	W 74–59	4–0	Carolina First Arena (2,148); Charleston, South Carolina
November 21*; 7:30 pm, ESNPU	No. 20	vs. North Carolina State; Charleston Classic finals	W 82–67	5–0	Carolina First Arena (4,631); Charleston, South Carolina
November 27*; 12:00 pm	No. 16	UNC Asheville	W 87–72	6–0	Verizon Center (10,354); Washington, D.C.
November 30*; 9:00 pm, ESPNU	No. 16	at No. 9 Missouri	W 111–102 ^{OT}	7–0	Sprint Center (14,647); Kansas City, Missouri
December 4*; 12:00 pm, ESPNU	No. 16	Utah State	W 68–51	8–0	Verizon Center (12,106); Washington, D.C.
December 9*; 9:00 pm, ESPN	No. 9	at Temple	L 65–68	8–1	Liacouras Center (9,509); Philadelphia
December 12*; 12:00 pm, ESPNU	No. 9	Appalachian State	W 89–60	9–1	Verizon Center (8,765); Washington, D.C.
December 18*; 12:00 pm, MASN	No. 15	Loyola	W 99–75	10–1	Verizon Center (11,745); Washington, D.C.
December 23*; 8:00 pm, ESPN2	No. 10	at No. 16 Memphis	W 86–69	11–1	FedExForum (17,842); Memphis, Tennessee
December 29; 7:00 pm, ESPN2	No. 9	at No. 15 Notre Dame	L 55–69	11–2 (0–1)	Edmund P. Joyce Center (9,149); South Bend, Indiana
January 1, 2011; 1:00 pm, MASN	No. 9	DePaul	W 86–75	12–2 (1–1)	Verizon Center (11,718); Washington, D.C.
January 3; 7:00 pm, ESPN2	No. 13	at St. John's	L 58–61	12–3 (1–2)	Madison Square Garden (8,897); New York City
January 8; 11:00 am, ESPN2	No. 13	West Virginia	L 59–65	12–4 (1–3)	Verizon Center (13,603); Washington, D.C.
January 12; 7:00 pm, ESPN2	No. 22	No. 5 Pittsburgh	L 57–72	12–5 (1–4)	Verizon Center (15,712); Washington, D.C.
January 15; 12:00 pm, ESPNU	No. 22	at Rutgers	W 74–65	13–5 (2–4)	Louis Brown Athletic Center (7,122); Piscataway, New Jersey
January 18; 7:00 pm, MASN	No. 23	at Seton Hall	W 80–75	14–5 (3–4)	Prudential Center (7,593); South Orange, New Jersey
January 26; 7:00 pm, MASN	No. 21	St. John's	W 77–52	15–5 (4–4)	Verizon Center (7,160); Washington, D.C.
January 29; 12:00 pm, ESPN	No. 21	at No. 8 Villanova	W 69–66	16–5 (5–4)	Wells Fargo Center (19,914); Philadelphia
January 31; 7:00 pm, ESPN	No. 13	No. 15 Louisville	W 62–59	17–5 (6–4)	Verizon Center (12,164); Washington, D.C.
February 5; 12:00 pm, MASN	No. 13	Providence	W 83–81	18–5 (7–4)	Verizon Center (16,289); Washington, D.C.
February 9; 7:00 pm, ESPN	No. 11	at No. 12 Syracuse; Rivalry	W 64–56	19–5 (8–4)	Carrier Dome (26,904); Syracuse, New York
February 13; 1:00 pm, ESPN	No. 11	Marquette	W 69–60	20–5 (9–4)	Verizon Center (14,284); Washington, D.C.
February 16; 7:00 pm, MASN	No. 9	at No. 12 Connecticut; Rivalry	L 70–78	20–6 (9–5)	XL Center (16,294); Hartford, Connecticut
February 19; 7:00 pm, ESPN2	No. 9	at South Florida	W 61–55	21–6 (10–5)	USF Sun Dome (6,190); Tampa, Florida
February 23; 9:00 pm, MASN	No. 11	Cincinnati	L 46–58	21–7 (10–6)	Verizon Center (13,241); Washington, D.C.
February 26; 12:00 pm, CBS	No. 11	No. 17 Syracuse; Rivalry	L 51–58	21–8 (10–7)	Verizon Center (20,276); Washington, D.C.
March 5; 7:00 pm, MASN	No. 17	at Cincinnati	L 47–69	21–9 (10–8)	Fifth Third Arena (12,197); Cincinnati
Big East tournament
March 9; 12:00 pm, ESPN	(8) No. 22	vs. (9) No. 21 Connecticut; Second round/Rivalry	L 62–79	21–10	Madison Square Garden (19,375); New York
NCAA tournament
March 18*; 9:50 pm, TNT	(6 SW) No. 22	vs. (11 SW) VCU; Second round	L 56–74	21–11	United Center (17,369); Chicago
*Non-conference game. ^{#}Rankings from AP Poll. (#) Tournament seedings in parentheses. SW=NCAA Southwest Regional. All times are in Eastern Time Zone.

== Awards and honors ==
=== Big East Conference honors ===
Postseason honors
Honors	Player	Position	Date awarded	Ref.
All-Big East First Team	Austin Freeman	G	March 6, 2011	
All-Big East Third Team	Chris Wright	G	March 6, 2011	
