= Gilbert Brown (basketball) =

American basketball coach

Pittsburgh Panthers
- Position: Assistant coach
- League: Atlantic Coast Conference

Personal information
- Born: September 5, 1987 (age 39) Harrisburg, Pennsylvania, U.S.
- Listed height: 6 ft 6 in (1.98 m)
- Listed weight: 215 lb (98 kg)

Career information
- High school: South Kent School (South Kent, Connecticut)
- College: Pittsburgh (2006–2011)
- NBA draft: 2011: undrafted
- Playing career: 2011–2020

Career history

Playing
- 2011: s.Oliver Baskets
- 2011–2012: Fort Wayne Mad Ants
- 2012: Sameji
- 2012: Caciques de Humacao
- 2012–2013: Bandırma Kırmızı
- 2013: Caciques de Humacao
- 2013–2014: Canton Charge
- 2014–2015: Pistoia 2000
- 2015–2017: Ironi Nahariya
- 2018–2019: Eisbären Bremerhaven
- 2019: Maccabi Ra'anana
- 2020: Hapoel Eilat

Coaching
- 2020-2021: South Kent School (associate HC)
- 2021-2023: Pittsburgh (dir. of player development)
- 2023-present: Pittsburgh (assistant)

Career highlights
- Israeli League All-Star (2016); NBA D-League All-Defensive Third Team (2014)

Gilbert Brown (born September 5, 1987) is an American basketball coach and former player who is currently an assistant coach for the University of Pittsburgh, where he also played college basketball. Brown played professionally in the NBA D-League and overseas.

== High school career ==
Brown attended high school at South Kent Prep in South Kent, Connecticut, where he was coached by Raphael Chillious. Serving as captain his senior year, he averaged 24.5 points, 6.5 rebounds and 4.0 assists per game, leading South Kent to a 17–17 record. Upon his graduation in 2006, Brown was South Kent Prep's all-time leading scorer with 1,157 points. He was ranked as the nation's No. 62 recruit and the nation's No. 19 shooting guard by Scout.com, ranked as the nation's No. 66 recruit and No. 14 shooting guard nationally by Rivals.com, and ranked the nation's No. 93 recruit by USA Today.

== College career ==
While Pittsburgh head coach Jamie Dixon originally planned on putting Brown in the starting lineup, an early season injury cut his freshman year short. After averaging just 4.3 minutes through three games, Brown received a medical redshirt due to an ankle injury and mononucleosis.

Brown played in all 37 games as redshirt freshman and started his first game for the Panthers in place of injured senior Mike Cook on December 29, 2007, at Dayton. He finished the year with 15 starts, averaging 22.0 minutes, 6.5 points, 3.1 assists and 1.5 rebounds per game helping Pittsburgh to a Big East tournament championship.

After missing the season's first four games due to a stress fracture in his left foot, Brown played in 32 games off the bench averaging 19.4 minutes, 5.4 points, 3.1 rebounds and 1.3 assists per game highlighted by a 30-point performance March 4 against Marquette.

In August 2009, Brown was suspended from the men's basketball team for the fall semester because of academic reasons. On December 22, 2009, returned from suspension playing 18 minutes off the bench against Ohio. He averaged 10.7 points per game during his junior season, which culminated with a 71–68 loss to Xavier in the second round of the 2010 NCAA Tournament.

Brown started every game of his senior season averaging 28 minutes player per game and 11.3 points per game. He helped lead Pitt to the 2010–11 Big East Regular Season Championship and a number 1 seed in the 2011 NCAA Men's Division I Basketball Tournament. He missed a free throw that would have sent Pittsburgh to the Sweet Sixteen. They lost after his teammate Nasir Robinson fouled Matt Howard while going for the rebound.

== Professional career ==
=== Early years (2011–2013) ===
Brown went undrafted in the 2011 NBA draft. On July 1, 2011, he signed a one-year deal with s.Oliver Baskets of Germany. In November 2011, he left s.Oliver after just eight games.

On December 12, 2011, Brown signed with the Boston Celtics. However, he was later waived by the Celtics on December 22, 2011. On December 30, 2011, Brown was acquired by the Fort Wayne Mad Ants. On February 13, 2012, he was waived by the Mad Ants. Later that month, he joined Sameji of the Dominican Republic.

On April 9, 2012, he signed with Caciques de Humacao of Puerto Rico. In June 2013, he left after 13 games.

In August 2012, Brown signed with Bandırma Kırmızı of Turkey for the 2012–13 season. In January 2013, he left Bandırma after 17 games.

In March 2013 he then re-joined Caciques de Humacao of Puerto Rico in June 2013.

=== Canton Charge (2013–2014) ===
On November 1, 2013, Brown was selected with 14th overall pick in the 2013 NBA D-League draft by the Canton Charge. In 40 games played for the Charge, he averaged 12.3 points, 3.5 rebounds and 2.5 assists per game.

=== Pistoia 2000 (2014–2015) ===
In July 2014, Brown joined the Milwaukee Bucks for the 2014 NBA Summer League.

On September 17, 2014, Brown signed with Pistoia Basket 2000 of Italy for the 2014–15 season. On December 7, 2014, Brown recorded a season-high 25 points, shooting 6-of-9 from the field, along with six rebounds in an 80–76 win over Pallacanestro Cantù. In 28 games played for Pistoia, he averaged 11.1 points, 3.6 rebounds and 1.2 assists per game.

=== Ironi Nahariya (2015–2017) ===
On August 25, 2015, Brown signed a one-year deal with Ironi Nahariya of the Israeli Premier League. On March 25, 2016, Brown won the Slam Dunk contest during the 2016 Israeli League All-Star Event. In 31 games played for Nahariya during the 2015–16 season, he averaged 13.1 points, 4.2 rebounds, 1.5 assists and 1.1 steals per game. Brown led Nahariya to the Israeli League Playoffs, where they eventually were eliminated by Hapoel Eilat in the quarterfinals.

On August 10, 2016, Brown re-signed with Ironi Nahariya for the 2016–17 season. On October 9, 2016, Brown recorded a career-high and a season league-high 38 points, shooting 9-of-13 from the field, along with five rebounds in a 93–97 overtime loss to Maccabi Tel Aviv. On February 5, 2017, Brown has been ruled out for the rest of the season after he suffered an ACL and meniscus tear in a match against Hapoel Eilat.

=== Eisbären Bremerhaven (2018–2019) ===
On November 13, 2018, Brown signed with Eisbären Bremerhaven for the 2018–19 season. He parted ways with Bremerhaven after appearing in seven games.

=== Return to Israel (2019–2020) ===
On August 25, 2019, Brown returned to Israel to sign with Hapoel Galil Elyon of the Israeli National League. On November 13, 2019, he parted ways with Galil Elyon before appearing in a game for them. On November 22, 2019, Brown signed a one-month contract with Maccabi Ra'anana as an injury cover for Tyler Wideman. In 6 games played for Ra'anana, he averaged 15.3 points, 6.3 rebounds and 2.8 assists per game.

On January 12, 2020, Brown signed with Hapoel Eilat for the rest of the season, joining his former head coach Eric Alfasi. Brown left Eilat in March 2020.

== Coaching ==
In 2021, Brown returned to Pittsburgh as an assistant coach.

== Career statistics ==
Legend
| GP | Games played | MPG | Minutes per game | FG% | Field goal percentage |
| 3P% | 3-point field goal percentage | FT% | Free throw percentage | RPG | Rebounds per game |
| APG | Assists per game | SPG | Steals per game | BPG | Blocks per game |
| PPG | Points per game | **Bold** | Career high | | Led the league |

=== College ===
| Year | Team | GP | GS | MPG | FG% | 3P% | FT% | RPG | APG | SPG | BPG | PPG |
|---|---|---|---|---|---|---|---|---|---|---|---|---|
| 2006–07 | Pittsburgh | 3 | 0 | 4.3 | .250 | .0 | .0 | .7 | .3 | .0 | .0 | .7 |
| 2007–08 | Pittsburgh | **37** | 15 | 22.0 | .467 | .244 | .750 | 3.1 | 1.5 | **.7** | .3 | 6.5 |
| 2008–09 | Pittsburgh | 32 | 0 | 19.4 | .434 | .282 | .698 | 3.1 | 1.3 | .5 | **.3** | 5.4 |
| 2009–10 | Pittsburgh | 23 | 0 | 23.7 | **.497** | .396 | .714 | 3.2 | 1.8 | .5 | .2 | 10.7 |
| 2010–11 | Pittsburgh | 34 | **34** | **28.0** | .458 | **.413** | **.789** | **4.4** | **2.7** | .4 | .3 | **11.3** |
| Career | | 129 | 49 | 22.8 | .463 | .342 | .745 | 3.4 | 1.8 | .5 | .2 | 8.1 |
