= 2010–11 Pittsburgh Panthers men's basketball team =

American college basketball season

2010–11 Pittsburgh Panthers men's basketball

Big East Regular Season Champions Coaches vs. Cancer Classic Champions Belfast Int'l Basketball Classic Champions

NCAA tournament, Round of 32
- Conference: Big East Conference

Ranking
- Coaches: No. 12
- AP: No. 4
- Record: 28–6 (15–3 Big East)
- Head coach: Jamie Dixon (8th season)
- Assistant coaches: Pat Sandle (10th season); Brandin Knight (3rd season); Pat Skerry (1st season)
- Home arena: Petersen Events Center (Capacity: 12,508)

2010–11 Big East men's basketball standings
	Conf.				Overall
Team	W		L	PCT	W		L	PCT
No. 4 Pittsburgh	15	–	3	.833	28	–	6	.824
No. 5 Notre Dame	14	–	4	.778	27	–	7	.794
*No. 12 Syracuse	12	–	6	.667	27	–	8	.771
No. 14 Louisville	12	–	6	.667	25	–	10	.714
No. 18 St. John's	12	–	6	.667	21	–	12	.636
Cincinnati	11	–	7	.611	26	–	9	.743
No. 22 West Virginia	11	–	7	.611	21	–	12	.636
Georgetown	10	–	8	.556	21	–	11	.656
No. 9 Connecticut†	9	–	9	.500	32	–	9	.780
Villanova	9	–	9	.500	21	–	12	.636
Marquette	9	–	9	.500	22	–	15	.595
Seton Hall	7	–	11	.389	13	–	18	.419
Rutgers	5	–	13	.278	15	–	17	.469
Providence	4	–	14	.222	15	–	17	.469
South Florida	3	–	15	.167	10	–	23	.303
DePaul	1	–	17	.056	7	–	24	.226
† 2011 Big East tournament winner As of April 4, 2011; *Syracuse:: 7 wins vacated due to sanctions against the program; Disputed record: Syracuse–(27–8)(10–6); Rankings from AP Poll

The 2010–11 Pittsburgh Panthers men's basketball team represented the University of Pittsburgh in the 2010–11 NCAA Division I men's basketball season. They were led by eighth-year head coach Jamie Dixon, in his twelfth total year at the university. The team played its home games in the Petersen Events Center in Pittsburgh, Pennsylvania and were members of the Big East Conference. They finished the season 28–6, 15–3 in Big East play to capture the regular season conference championship. As the 1 seed in the 2011 Big East men's basketball tournament, they were upset by 9 seed Connecticut in their first tournament game. They received an at-large bid to the 2011 NCAA Division I men's basketball tournament as the 1 seed in the southeast region. They defeated 16 seed UNC Asheville in the first round before being upset by 8 seed Butler in the second round.

== Outlook ==
The Pittsburgh Panthers finished the 2009 season 25–9, 13–5 in Big East play and lost in the quarterfinals of the 2010 Big East men's basketball tournament. They received an at–large bid to the 2010 NCAA Division I men's basketball tournament, earning a 3 seed in the West Region. They defeated 14 seed Oakland in the first round before being upset by 6 seed and AP No. 25 Xavier in the second round. Finishing at No. 20 in the final Coaches' Poll, Pitt returned four starters and the bulk of their reserves, including 86% of its scoring and 88% of its rebounding. Pitt was ranked in the 2010-11 preseason among the top ten teams in the nation, and among the favorites to win the Big East Conference, by multiple national publications.

The Panthers conducted a preseason tour of Ireland, going undefeated in several exhibition games played against national and professional teams.

At the Big East Conference media day on October 20, Pitt was selected by a vote of the league's coaches to finish first in the Big East Conference, receiving 12 out of 15 possible first place votes. Pitt guard Ashton Gibbs received a preseason first-team all-conference selection. The Panthers were ranked fourth in the nation in the preseason USA Today Coaches' Poll and fifth in the nation in the preseason AP Poll.

== Season ==
Pittsburgh finished their out-of-conference schedule 12–1, losing only to Tennessee at the Consol Energy Center, home of the Pittsburgh Penguins.

As of March 7, the Panthers were ranked third nationwide in both polls. They finished the regular season at the top of the Big East Conference, with a 15-3 record in conference play.

The Panthers earned a number one seed in the 2011 NCAA Division I men's basketball tournament, the third overall seed in the tournament.

The Panthers used a balanced attack, with eight players averaging 4.9 points per game or more. Gilbert Brown and Brad Wanamaker both averaged over ten points a game, while Ashton Gibbs led the team at 15.9 ppg (eighth in the Big East).

== Coaching staff ==
Name	Position	Year at Pittsburgh	Alma mater (year)
Jamie Dixon	Head coach	12th (8th as head coach)	TCU (1987)
Pat Sandle	Assistant coach	10th	San Francisco State (1987)
Brandin Knight	Assistant coach	5th	University of Pittsburgh (2005)
Pat Skerry	Assistant coach	1st	Tufts (1992)
Brian Regan	Director of basketball operations	4th	Saint Vincent (1988)
Jordan Marks	Video coordinator	2nd	University of Pittsburgh (2008)
Jason Richards	Video assistant	1st	Davidson (2008)

== Recruiting ==
College recruiting
Name	Hometown	School	Height	Weight	Commit date
Isaiah Epps point guard	Chatham, Virginia	Hargrave Military Academy	6 ft 2 in (1.88 m)	170 lb (77 kg)	Jan 11, 2009
Isaiah Epps point guard	Recruit ratings: Scout: Rivals: (93)				
J. J. Moore small forward	South Kent, Connecticut	South Kent School	6 ft 6 in (1.98 m)	195 lb (88 kg)	Nov 11, 2009
J. J. Moore small forward	Recruit ratings: Scout: Rivals: (94)				
Cameron Wright shooting guard	Cleveland, Ohio	Benedictine High School	6 ft 4.5 in (1.94 m)	195 lb (88 kg)	Aug 9, 2009
Cameron Wright shooting guard	Recruit ratings: Scout: Rivals: (93)				
Overall recruit ranking: Scout: not ranked Rivals: not ranked
Note: In many cases, Scout, Rivals, 247Sports, On3, and ESPN may conflict in their listings of height and weight.; In these cases, the average was taken. ESPN grades are on a 100-point scale.; Sources: "Pittsburgh Commit List for 2010". Rivals.; "Men's Basketball Recruiting". Scout.; "Pittsburgh Basketball Recruiting 2010". ESPN.; "Scout.com Team Recruiting Rankings". Scout.; "2010 Team Ranking". Rivals.

== Roster ==
Name	#	Position	Height	Weight (lb.)	Year	Hometown	Previous school
Gilbert Brown	5	Forward	6 ft 6 in (1.98 m)	215	Senior (RS)	Harrisburg, PA	South Kent School
Isaiah Epps	2	Guard	6 ft 2 in (1.88 m)	175	Freshman	Plainfield, NJ	Hargrave Military Academy/Plainfield HS
Ashton Gibbs	12	Guard	6 ft 2 in (1.88 m)	190	Junior	Scotch Plains, NJ	Seton Hall Prep
Gary McGhee	52	Center	6 ft 11 in (2.11 m)	250	Senior	Anderson, IN	Highland HS
J. J. Moore	44	Forward	6 ft 6 in (1.98 m)	200	Freshman	Brentwood, NY	South Kent School/Brentwood HS
Aron Nwankwo	15	Forward	6 ft 7 in (2.01 m)	200	Freshman	Baltimore, MD	Baltimore City College
Lamar Patterson	21	Guard/Forward	6 ft 5 in (1.96 m)	220	Freshman (RS)	Lancaster, PA	St. Benedict's Prep/J.P. McCaskey H.S.
J. J. Richardson	55	Forward/Center	6 ft 7 in (2.01 m)	235	Sophomore	Missouri City, TX	Fort Bend Hightower HS
Nick Rivers	14	Guard	6 ft 0 in (1.83 m)	180	Senior	Phoenix, AZ	Brophy College Prep
Nasir Robinson	35	Forward	6 ft 5 in (1.96 m)	220	Junior	Chester, PA	Chester HS
Dante Taylor	11	Forward	6 ft 9 in (2.06 m)	240	Sophomore	Greenburgh, NY	National Christian Academy](MD)
Brad Wanamaker	22	Guard	6 ft 4 in (1.93 m)	210	Senior	Philadelphia, PA	Roman Catholic HS
Travon Woodall	1	Guard	5 ft 11 in (1.80 m)	190	Sophomore (RS)	Brooklyn, NY-Paterson, NJ	St. Anthony HS
Cameron Wright	3	Guard	6 ft 4 in (1.93 m)	200	Freshman	Cleveland, OH	Benedictine HS
Talib Zanna	42	Forward	6 ft 9 in (2.06 m)	225	Freshman (RS)	Kaduna, Nigeria	Bishop McNamara HS (MD)

== Schedule ==
Date time, TV	Rank^{#}	Opponent^{#}	Result	Record	Site (attendance) city, state
Ireland Summer competition tour
Sat. Jul. 31*; 2:00 pm		Ireland Select	W 99–54	—	Neptune Stadium (1,650); Cork, Ireland
Sun. Aug. 1*; 9:00 am		South Regional All-Stars	W 92–52	—	Neptune Stadium (857); Cork, Ireland
Tue. Aug. 3*; 2:30 pm		Ireland Select	W 110–61	—	DCU Arena (897); Dublin, Ireland
Wed. Aug. 4*; 2:30 pm		Dart Killester	W 88–62	—	DCU Arena (1,253); Dublin, Ireland
Fri. Aug. 6*; 3:30 pm		vs. Melbourne Tigers; Belfast International Basketball Classic	W 92–76	—	Odyssey Arena (3,309); Belfast, Northern Ireland
Sat. Aug. 7*; 12:00 pm		vs. England National Team; Belfast International Basketball Classic	W 82–69	—	Odyssey Arena (1,830); Belfast, Northern Ireland
Exhibition
Sun. Oct. 31*; 2:00 pm, Comcast Network	No. 5	Northwood (Fl.)	W 104–62		Petersen Events Center (6,240); Pittsburgh, PA
Thu. Nov. 4*; 7:00 pm, Comcast Network	No. 5	No. 2 (Div. II)^{^} Indiana (Pa.)	W 73–56		Petersen Events Center (6,728); Pittsburgh, PA
Regular season
Mon. Nov. 8*; 7:00 pm, ESPNU	No. 5	Rhode Island; 2K Sports Classic/Coaches vs. Cancer	W 83–75	1–0	Petersen Events Center (9,256); Pittsburgh, PA
Wed. Nov. 10*; 7:00 pm, ESPN3	No. 5	Illinois-Chicago; 2K Sports Classic/Coaches vs. Cancer	W 97–54	2–0	Petersen Events Center (9,148); Pittsburgh, PA
Sat. Nov. 13*; 4:00 pm, ESPN Regional/FSN Pittsburgh	No. 5	North Florida	W 95–49	3–0	Petersen Events Center (10,052); Pittsburgh, PA
Thu. Nov. 18*; 7:00 pm, ESPN2	No. 5	vs. Maryland; 2K Sports Classic/Coaches vs. Cancer	W 79–70	4–0	Madison Square Garden; New York, NY
Fri. Nov. 19*; 7:35 pm, ESPN2	No. 5	vs. Texas; 2K Sports Classic/Coaches vs. Cancer Championship	W 68–66	5–0	Madison Square Garden (11,723); New York, NY
Tue. Nov. 23*; 7:00 pm, ESPN Regional/FSN Pittsburgh	No. 5	Robert Morris	W 74–53	6–0	Petersen Events Center (10,121); Pittsburgh, PA
Sat. Nov. 27*; 7:00 pm, ESPN3	No. 5	Penn	W 82–58	7–0	Petersen Events Center (10,594); Pittsburgh, PA
Wed. Dec. 1*; 9:00 pm, ESPNU	No. 3	vs. Duquesne; The City Game	W 80–66	8–0	CONSOL Energy Center (12,860); Pittsburgh, PA
Sat. Dec. 4*; 2:00 pm, ESPN Regional/FSN Pittsburgh	No. 3	Rider	W 87–68	9–0	Petersen Events Center (8,719); Pittsburgh, PA
Wed. Dec. 8*; 7:00 pm, ESPN3	No. 3	Delaware State	W 70–42	10–0	Petersen Events Center (8,520); Pittsburgh, PA
Sat. Dec. 11*; 3:25 pm, ESPN	No. 3	vs. No. 11 Tennessee; DirecTV SEC/Big East Invitational	L 76–83	10–1	CONSOL Energy Center (15,166); Pittsburgh, PA
Sat. Dec. 18*; 7:00 pm, ESPN Regional/FSN Pittsburgh	No. 8	Maryland Eastern Shore	W 97–64	11–1	Petersen Events Center (9,515); Pittsburgh, PA
Wed. Dec. 22*; 7:00 pm, ESPN3	No. 6	American	W 61–46	12–1	Petersen Events Center (9,489); Pittsburgh, PA
Mon. Dec. 27; 8:30 pm, ESPN2	No. 6	No. 4 Connecticut; Big Monday	W 78–63	13–1 (1–0)	Petersen Events Center (12,725); Pittsburgh, PA
Tue. Jan. 4; 7:00 pm, ESPN Regional/FSN Pittsburgh	No. 5	at Providence	W 83–79	14–1 (2–0)	Dunkin Donuts Center (9,181); Providence, RI
Sat. Jan. 8; 2:00 pm, ESPN Regional/WTAE-TV	No. 5	Marquette	W 89–81	15–1 (3–0)	Petersen Events Center (11,438); Pittsburgh, PA
Wed. Jan. 12; 7:00 pm, ESPN/ESPN2	No. 5	at No. 22 Georgetown	W 72–57	16–1 (4–0)	Verizon Center (15,712); Washington, D.C.
Sat. Jan. 15; 7:00 pm, ESPN Regional/FSN Pittsburgh	No. 5	Seton Hall	W 74–53	17–1 (5–0)	Petersen Events Center (9,236); Pittsburgh, PA
Mon. Jan. 17; 7:30 pm, ESPN	No. 5	No. 3 Syracuse; Big Monday	W 74–66	18–1 (6–0)	Petersen Events Center (12,925); Pittsburgh, PA
Sat. Jan. 22; 4:00 pm, ESPN Regional/FSN Pittsburgh	No. 5	at DePaul	W 80–50	19–1 (7–0)	Allstate Arena (8,325); Rosemont, IL
Mon. Jan. 24; 7:00 pm, ESPN	No. 2	No. 15 Notre Dame; Big Monday	L 51–56	19–2 (7–1)	Petersen Events Center (12,591); Pittsburgh, PA
Sat. Jan. 29; 8:00 pm, ESPN2	No. 2	at Rutgers	W 65–62	20–2 (8–1)	Louis Brown Athletic Center (8,024); Piscataway, NJ
Sat. Feb. 5; 6:00 pm, ESPN Regional/FSN Pittsburgh	No. 4	Cincinnati	W 71–59	21–2 (9–1)	Petersen Events Center (12,615); Pittsburgh, PA
Mon. Feb. 7; 7:00 pm, ESPN	No. 4	at No. 25 West Virginia; Backyard Brawl, Big Monday	W 71–66	22–2 (10–1)	WVU Coliseum (14,175); Morgantown, WV
Sat. Feb. 12; 9:00 pm, ESPN	No. 4	at No. 9 Villanova; ESPN College GameDay	W 57–54	23–2 (11–1)	The Pavilion (6,500); Villanova, PA
Wed. Feb. 16; 7:00 pm, ESPN3	No. 4	South Florida	W 67–55	24–2 (12–1)	Petersen Events Center (12,519); Pittsburgh, PA
Sat. Feb. 19; 12:00 pm, ESPN	No. 4	at St. John's	L 59–60	24–3 (12–2)	Madison Square Garden (14,514); New York, NY
Thu. Feb. 24; 9:00 pm, ESPN	No. 4	West Virginia; Backyard Brawl	W 71–58	25–3 (13–2)	Petersen Events Center (12,876); Pittsburgh, PA
Sun. Feb. 27; 2:00 pm, CBS	No. 4	at No. 16 Louisville	L 59–62 ^{OT}	25–4 (13–3)	KFC Yum! Center (22,758); Louisville, KY
Wed. Mar. 2; 9:00 pm, ESPNU	No. 4	at South Florida	W 66–50	26–4 (14–3)	USF Sun Dome (4,640); Tampa, FL
Sat. Mar. 5; 4:00 pm, CBS	No. 4	No. 19 Villanova	W 60–50	27–4 (15–3)	Petersen Events Center (12,843); Pittsburgh, PA
Big East tournament
Thu. Mar. 10; 12:00 pm, ESPN	(1) No. 3	vs. (9) No. 21 Connecticut; Big East Quarterfinal	L 74–76	27–5	Madison Square Garden (19,375); New York, NY
NCAA tournament
Thu. Mar. 17*; 3:10 pm, truTV	(1 SE) No. 4	vs. (16 SE) UNC Asheville; NCAA Second Round	W 74–51	28–5	Verizon Center (17,578); Washington, D.C.
Sat. Mar. 19*; 7:10 pm, TBS	(1 SE) No. 4	vs. (8 SE) Butler; NCAA Third Round	L 70–71	28–6	Verizon Center (18,684); Washington, D.C.
*Non-conference game. ^{#}Rankings from Division I AP Poll unless otherwise noted. ^{^}Division II NABC Coaches' Poll.. (#) Tournament seedings in parentheses. SE=NCAA Southeast Regional. All times are in Eastern Standard Time.

== Rankings ==
Ranking movement Legend: ██ Improvement in ranking. ██ Decrease in ranking. ██ Not ranked the previous week. rv=Others receiving votes.
Poll	Pre	Wk 1	Wk 2	Wk 3	Wk 4	Wk 5	Wk 6	Wk 7	Wk 8	Wk 9	Wk 10	Wk 11	Wk 12	Wk 13	Wk 14	Wk 15	Wk 16	Wk 17	Wk 18	Final
AP	5	5	5	3	3	8	6	6	5	5	5	2	4	4	4	4	4	3	4	n/a
Coaches	4	4	5	3	3	8	6	6	5	5	4	2	4	4	4	6	5	3	4	12

== Accomplishments ==
- Pitt won the 2010 2K Sports Classic benefiting Coaches vs. Cancer tournament championship in November 2010, defeating Maryland in the semifinals and Texas in the finals at Madison Square Garden.
- Pitt head coach Jamie Dixon won his 200th game with a 61-46 win over American on December 22, 2010. With the victory, Dixon tied the all-time NCAA Division I record held by Mark Few and Roy Williams for the fastest coach to earn 200 wins by achieving the mark in only eight seasons. The achievement of winning his first 200 out of 255 games also ranked Dixon among the all-time top-15 for the quickest coaches to achieve 200 victories in regards to total number of games played.
- With a win over third ranked and undefeated Syracuse on January 17, 2011, Pitt started the Big East regular season 6–0 for the first time in school history, and ran its Petersen Events Center record against teams ranked in the top five of the AP Poll to 9–0.
- With a win at South Florida on March 2, 2011:

Pitt clinched at least a share of the Big East Conference regular season championship
The senior class of Gilbert Brown, Brad Wanamaker and Gary McGhee accumulated the most wins of any class in school history with 109 total wins.
With his 214th win, head coach Jamie Dixon became the all-time NCAA leader in wins through a coach's first eight seasons.
Brad Wanamaker became only the second player in school history to score 1,000 points, grab 500 rebounds, and give 400 assists.
Pitt finished a school record 7-2 in Big East road games

- With a win over Villanova on March 5, 2011, Pitt won the outright Big East Regular Season Championship and tied a school record for Big East wins with 15.
- Junior guard Ashton Gibbs was named to the All-Big East first-team and senior guard Brad Wanamaker was named to the All-Big East second team.
- Senior guard Brad Wanamaker won the Big East Sportsmanship Award.
- Pitt received a number one seed in the 2011 NCAA Tournament for the second time in school history. The seed represented the third overall seed in the tournament.
- For the sixth straight year, Pitt won at least one game in the NCAA Tournament, the longest such active streak in the nation.
- 2010-11: Head coach Jamie Dixon won the Sporting News National Coach of the Year award.
- Ashton Gibbs and Brad Wanamaker were named Associated Press Honorable Mention All-Americans.
