= Charleston Classic =

US college basketball tournament

Shriners Children's Charleston Classic
- Sport: College basketball
- Founded: 2008
- No. of teams: 8
- Country: United States
- Most recent champions: Lowcountry: Utah State; Palmetto: Clemson
- Most titles: Clemson & Miami (FL) (2)
- Broadcaster: ESPN
- Sponsor: Shriners Hospitals for Children
- Website: CharlestonClassic.com

The Shriners Children's Charleston Classic is an eight team invitational college basketball season-opening tournament held in Charleston, South Carolina. An ESPN-owned and operated event, it is contested at TD Arena, home of the Charleston Cougars. The inaugural tournament was held November 14–16, 2008. From 2009 through 2024, it was a four-day invitational with each team playing three games (since the second edition, the tournament has been staged as a Thursday, Friday and Sunday format with a Saturday off day). Starting in 2025, the eight teams were sliced into two four-team brackets, with each team playing two games over three days.

== Tournament history ==
=== Tournament champions ===
Year	Bracket	Winner	Score	Opponent	Tournament MVP	Location
2008		Clemson	76–72	Temple	Trevor Booker, Clemson	TD Arena, Charleston, SC
2009		Miami (FL)	85–70	South Carolina	Dwayne Collins, Miami (FL)	TD Arena, Charleston, SC
2010		Georgetown	82–67	NC State	Chris Wright, Georgetown	TD Arena, Charleston, SC
2011		Northwestern	80–73	Seton Hall	Drew Crawford, Northwestern	TD Arena, Charleston, SC
2012		Colorado	81–74	Murray State	Askia Booker, Colorado	TD Arena, Charleston, SC
2013		UMass	62–56	Clemson	Cady Lalanne, UMass	TD Arena, Charleston, SC
2014		Miami (FL) (2)	77–58	Charlotte	Ángel Rodríguez, Miami (FL)	TD Arena, Charleston, SC
2015		Virginia	83–66	George Mason	London Perrantes, Virginia	TD Arena, Charleston, SC
2016		Villanova	67–57	UCF	Josh Hart, Villanova	TD Arena, Charleston, SC
2017		Temple	67–60	Clemson	Obi Enechionyia, Temple	TD Arena, Charleston, SC
2018		Virginia Tech	89–83	Purdue	Nickeil Alexander-Walker, Virginia Tech	TD Arena, Charleston, SC
2019		Florida	70–65	Xavier	Keyontae Johnson, Florida	TD Arena, Charleston, SC
2021		St. Bonaventure	70–54	Marquette	Kyle Lofton, St. Bonaventure	TD Arena, Charleston, SC
2022		Charleston	77–75	Virginia Tech	Ryan Larson, Charleston	TD Arena, Charleston, SC
2023		Houston	69–55	Dayton	LJ Cryer, Houston	TD Arena, Charleston, SC
2024		Drake	81–70	Vanderbilt	Bennett Stirtz, Drake	TD Arena, Charleston, SC
2025	Lowcountry	Utah State	94–60	Davidson	MJ Collins, Utah State	TD Arena, Charleston, SC
2025	Palmetto	Clemson	97–94	Georgia	Jestin Porter, Clemson	TD Arena, Charleston, SC

Most Appearances
Team	Appearances	Championships	Years
Clemson	5	2	2008, 2013, 2017, 2021, 2025
Davidson	5	—	2009, 2013, 2018, 2022, 2025
Charleston	4	1	2008, 2012, 2016, 2022
Miami (FL)	4	2	2009, 2014, 2019, 2024
Temple	4	1	2008, 2013, 2017, 2021
Dayton	3	—	2012, 2017, 2023
Penn State	3	—	2009, 2014, 2022
Seton Hall	3	—	2011, 2015, 2024
South Carolina	3	—	2009, 2014, 2022
Towson	3	—	2015, 2019, 2023
Auburn	2	—	2012, 2017
Boise State	2	—	2016, 2021
Boston College	2	—	2012, 2025
Charlotte	2	—	2010, 2014
George Mason	2	—	2010, 2015
Georgia	2	—	2013, 2025
Hofstra	2	—	2008, 2017
LSU	2	—	2011, 2023
Oklahoma State	2	—	2015, 2024
Old Dominion	2	—	2017, 2022
Ole Miss	2	—	2015, 2021
Saint Joseph's	2	—	2011, 2019
St. John's	2	—	2012, 2023
Tulane	2	—	2009, 2025
VCU	2	—	2011, 2024
Virginia Tech	2	1	2018, 2022
Wake Forest	2	—	2016, 2023
Western Michigan	2	—	2008, 2016
West Virginia	2	—	2021, 2025
Xavier	2	—	2019, 2025
Colorado	1	1	2012
Drake	1	1	2024
Florida	1	1	2019
Georgetown	1	1	2010
Houston	1	1	2023
Northwestern	1	1	2011
St. Bonaventure	1	1	2021
UMass	1	1	2013
Utah State	1	1	2025
Villanova	1	1	2016
Virginia	1	1	2015

== Brackets ==
=== 2026 ===
The 2026 Charleston Classic will consist of 3 stand alone games played each day on November 20 and 22. Each team will play a total of two games. Participating teams:

- Dayton
- Minnesota
- Northwestern
- Oklahoma State
- Utah
- Virginia Tech

=== 2025 ===
The 2025 Shriners Children's Charleston Classic, held annually at TD Arena in Charleston, South Carolina, will take place on November 21 and 23. For the first time in event history, the field of eight teams is being split into two separate four-team brackets (labeled Lowcountry and Palmetto).

==== Lowcountry Bracket ====
Consolation; November 23; ESPN2
Tulane	93^{OT}
Boston College	90

Semifinals; November 21; ESPN2
Utah State	96
Tulane	75
Davidson	59
Boston College	49

Championship; November 23; ESPN2
Utah State	94
Davidson	60

==== Palmetto Bracket ====
Consolation; November 23; ESPN
West Virginia	68
Xavier	78

Semifinals; November 21; ESPNU and ESPN2
West Virginia	67
Clemson	70
Georgia	78
Xavier	77

Championship; November 23; ESPN
Clemson	97^{OT}
Georgia	94

=== 2024 ===
The 2024 tournament took place at TD Arena in Charleston, South Carolina from November 21 - 24, 2024.

5th Place Game; Sunday, November 24
Oklahoma State	78
Nevada	90
7th Place Game
Miami (FL)	70
VCU	77

Consolation 2nd Round; Friday, November 22
Miami (FL)	74
Oklahoma State	80
VCU	61
Nevada	64

First Round; Thursday, November 21
Miami (FL)	69
Drake	80
Oklahoma State	78
Florida Atlantic	86
Seton Hall	69^{OT}
VCU	66
Vanderbilt	73
Nevada	71

Semifinals; Friday, November 22
Drake	75
Florida Atlantic	63
Seton Hall	60
Vanderbilt	76

Championship; Sunday, November 24
Drake	81
Vanderbilt	70
3rd Place Game
Florida Atlantic	61
Seton Hall	63

=== 2023 ===
The 2023 tournament took place at TD Arena in Charleston, South Carolina from November 16 - 19, 2023.

5th Place Game; Sunday, November 19
LSU	86
Wake Forest	80
7th Place Game
North Texas	65
Towson	39

Consolation 2nd Round; Friday, November 17
North Texas	62
LSU	66
Towson	61
Wake Forest	71

First Round; Thursday, November 16
St. John's	53
North Texas	52
Dayton	70
LSU	67
6	Houston	65
Towson	49
Utah	77
Wake Forest	70

Semifinals; Friday, November 17
St. John’s	81
Dayton	88
6	Houston	76
Utah	66

Championship; Sunday, November 19
Dayton	55
6	Houston	69
3rd Place Game
St. John’s	91
Utah	82

=== 2022 ===
The 2022 tournament took place at TD Arena in Charleston, South Carolina from November 17 - 20, 2022.

5th Place Game; Sunday, November 20
Old Dominion	61
Davidson	66
7th Place Game
Furman	79
South Carolina	60

Consolation 2nd Round; Friday, November 18
Furman	77
Old Dominion	82
South Carolina	60
Davidson	69

First Round; Thursday, November 17
Furman	68
Penn State	73
Old Dominion	71
Virginia Tech	75
Colorado State	85
South Carolina	53
Davidson	66
Charleston	89

Semifinals; Friday, November 18
Penn State	59
Virginia Tech	61
Colorado State	64
Charleston	74

Championship; Sunday, November 20
Virginia Tech	75
Charleston	77
3rd Place Game
Penn State	68
Colorado State	56

=== 2021 ===
5th Place Game; Sunday, November 21
Boise State	60
Ole Miss	50
7th Place Game
Temple	75
Elon	58

Consolation 2nd Round; Friday, November 19
Boise State	82
Temple	62
Ole Miss	74
Elon	56

First Round; Thursday, November 18
22	St. Bonaventure	67
Boise State	61
Clemson	75
Temple	48
Marquette	78
Ole Miss	72
Elon	68
West Virginia	87

Semifinals; Friday, November 19
22	St. Bonaventure	68
Clemson	65
Marquette	82
West Virginia	71

Championship; Sunday, November 21
22	St. Bonaventure	70
Marquette	54
3rd Place Game
Clemson	59
West Virginia	66

=== 2019 ===
5th Place Game; Sunday, November 24
Missouri State	74
Buffalo	75
7th Place Game
St. Joseph's	64
Towson	76

Consolation 2nd Round; Friday, November 22
Missouri State	71
Saint Joseph's	69
Towson	73
Buffalo	76

First Round; Thursday, November 21
Missouri State	70
Miami (FL)	74
Florida	70
Saint Joseph's	62
18	Xavier	73
Towson	51
Buffalo	68
UConn	79

Semifinals; Friday, November 22
Miami (FL)	58
Florida	78
18	Xavier	75
UConn	74^{2OT}

Championship; Sunday, November 24
Florida	70
18	Xavier	65
3rd Place Game
Miami (FL)	55
UConn	80

=== 2018 ===
5th Place Game; Sunday, November 18
Alabama	90
Wichita State	85
7th Place Game
Ball State	94
Appalachian State	86^{OT}

Consolation 2nd Round; Friday, November 16
Ball State	61
Alabama	79
Appalachian State	76
Wichita State	82

First Round; Thursday, November 15
Ball State	64
16	Virginia Tech	73
Alabama	52
Northeastern	68
23	Purdue	73
Appalachian State	70
Wichita State	53
Davidson	57

Semifinals; Friday, November 16
16	Virginia Tech	88
Northeastern	60
23	Purdue	79
Davidson	58

Championship; Sunday, November 18
16	Virginia Tech	89
23	Purdue	83
3rd Place Game
Northeastern	59
Davidson	71

=== 2017 ===
5th Place Game; Sunday, November 19
Old Dominion	75
Dayton	67
7th Place Game
Indiana State	94
Ohio	96^{4OT}

Consolation 2nd Round; Friday, November 17
Indiana State	44
Old Dominion	62
Ohio	65
Dayton	79

First Round; Thursday, November 16
Auburn	83
Indiana State	64
Old Dominion	65
Temple	76
Clemson	81
Ohio	76
Dayton	53
Hofstra	57

Semifinals; Friday, November 17
Auburn	74
Temple	88
Clemson	78
Hofstra	59

Championship; Sunday, November 19
Temple	67
Clemson	60
3rd Place Game
Auburn	89
Hofstra	78

=== 2016 ===
5th Place Game; Sunday, November 20
UTEP	54
Mississippi State	61
7th Place Game
Western Michigan	70
Boise State	91

Consolation 2nd Round; Friday, November 18
Western Michigan	75
UTEP	85
Mississippi State	80
Boise State	68

First Round; Thursday, November 17
Western Michigan	65
3	Villanova	76
Wake Forest	103
UTEP	81
Mississippi State	61
UCF	86
Boise State	47
Charleston	60

Semifinals; Friday, November 18
3	Villanova	96
Wake Forest	77
UCF	60
Charleston	40

Championship; Sunday, November 20
3	Villanova	67
UCF	57
3rd Place Game
Wake Forest	78
Charleston	61

=== 2015 ===
5th Place Game; Sunday, November 22
Ole Miss	63
Seton Hall	75
7th Place Game
Towson	62
Bradley	60

Consolation 2nd Round; Friday, November 20
Ole Miss	76
Towson	60
Seton Hall	67
Bradley	59

First Round; Thursday, November 19
Ole Miss	62
George Mason	68
Oklahoma State	69
Towson	62
Long Beach State	80
Seton Hall	77
6	Virginia	82
Bradley	57

Semifinals; Friday, November 20
George Mason	71^{OT}
Oklahoma State	68
Long Beach State	52
6	Virginia	87

Championship; Sunday, November 22
George Mason	66
6	Virginia	83
3rd Place Game
Oklahoma State	82
Long Beach State	77

=== 2014 ===
5th Place Game; Sunday, November 22; ESPN3
USC	61
Penn State	63
7th Place Game; ESPN3
Drexel	61
Cornell	59

Consolation 2nd Round; Friday, November 21; ESPNU / ESPN3
USC	72
Drexel	70
Penn State	72
Cornell	71

First Round; Thursday, November 20; ESPNU / ESPN3
USC	46
Akron	66
Drexel	46
Miami (FL)	66
Penn State	95
Charlotte	106^{2OT}
Cornell	45
South Carolina	69

Semifinals; Friday, November 21; ESPN2 / ESPNU
Akron	51
Miami (FL)	79
Charlotte	65
South Carolina	63

Championship; Sunday, November 23; ESPN2
Miami (FL)	77
Charlotte	58
3rd Place Game; ESPNU
Akron	68
South Carolina	63

=== 2013 ===
5th Place Game; Sunday, November 24; ESPN3
UAB	66
Temple	87
7th Place Game; ESPN3
Nebraska	73
Georgia	65

Consolation 2nd Round; Friday, November 22
Nebraska	74
UAB	87
Georgia	81
Temple	83

First Round; Thursday, November 21
Nebraska	90
UMass	96
UAB	94
19	New Mexico	97
Georgia	82
Davidson	94
Temple	58
Clemson	72

Semifinals; Friday, November 22
UMass	81
19	New Mexico	65
Davidson	54
Clemson	85

Championship; Sunday, November 24; ESPN2
22	UMass	62
Clemson	56
3rd Place Game; ESPNU
19	New Mexico	79
Davidson	58

=== 2012 ===
5th Place Game; Sunday, November 18; ESPN3
Dayton	73
Auburn	63
7th Place Game; ESPN3
Boston College	67
Charleston	71

Consolation 2nd Round; Friday, November 16
Dayton	87
Boston College	71
Charleston	51
Auburn	55

First Round; Thursday, November 15
Dayton	57
Colorado	67
16	Baylor	84
Boston College	74
St. John's	64
Charleston	53
Murray State	79
Auburn	59

Semifinals; Friday, November 16
Colorado	60
16	Baylor	58
St. John's	67
Murray State	72

Championship; Sunday, November 18; ESPN2
22	Colorado	81
Murray State	74
3rd Place Game; ESPNU
19	Baylor	97
St. John's	78

=== 2011 ===
5th Place Game; Sunday, November 20
LSU	59
Georgia Tech	50
7th Place Game
WKU	64
VCU	69

Consolation 2nd Round; Friday, November 18
WKU	56
LSU	67
VCU	60
Georgia Tech	73

First Round; Thursday, November 17
Tulsa	65
WKU	49
LSU	82
Northwestern	88
VCU	54
Seton Hall	69
Georgia Tech	53
Saint Joseph's	66

Semifinals; Friday, November 18
Tulsa	65
Northwestern	69
Seton Hall	78
Saint Joseph's	70

Championship; Sunday, November 20
Northwestern	80
Seton Hall	73
3rd Place Game
Tulsa	75
Saint Joseph's	79

''Note:'' The 2011 tournament was the first Charleston Classic without the host Southern Conference (SoCon) sending a representative.

=== 2010 ===
5th Place Game; Sunday, November 20
Coastal Carolina	79
Charlotte	75
7th Place Game
USC Upstate	67
East Carolina	75

Consolation 2nd Round; Friday, November 18
Coastal Carolina	71
USC Upstate	50
East Carolina	63
Charlotte	74

First Round; Thursday, November 17
Coastal Carolina	61
20	Georgetown	80
USC Upstate	61
Wofford	79
East Carolina	65
NC State	85
George Mason	78
Charlotte	56

Semifinals; Friday, November 18
20	Georgetown	74
Wofford	59
NC State	78
George Mason	65

Championship; Sunday, November 20
20	Georgetown	82
NC State	67
3rd Place Game
Wofford	82
George Mason	79

=== 2009 ===
5th Place Game; Sunday, November 22
Tulane	59
La Salle	61
7th Place Game
Penn State	59
Davidson	57

Consolation 2nd Round; Friday, November 20
Tulane	63
Penn State	60
Davidson	70
La Salle	84

First Round; Thursday, November 19
Tulane	54
20	Miami (FL)	74
UNC Wilmington	80
Penn State	69
South Florida	65
Davidson	58
La Salle	68
South Carolina	78

Semifinals; Friday, November 20
20	Miami (FL)	67
UNC Wilmington	60
South Florida	66
South Carolina	69

Championship; Sunday, November 22
20	Miami (FL)	85
South Carolina	70
3rd Place Game
UNC Wilmington	66
South Florida	74

=== 2008 ===
5th Place Game; Sunday, November 16
East Tennessee State	75
Hofstra	76
7th Place Game
SIU Edwardsville	83
Western Michigan	72

Consolation 2nd Round; Saturday, November 15
SIU Edwardsville	62
East Tennessee State	65
Hofstra	71
Western Michigan	68

First Round; Friday, November 14
SIU Edwardsville	66
Charleston	72
Temple	75
East Tennessee State	69
Clemson	98
Hofstra	69
TCU	67
Western Michigan	63

Semifinals; Saturday, November 15
Charleston	65
Temple	70
Clemson	70
TCU	58

Championship; Sunday, November 16
Temple	72
Clemson	76
3rd Place Game
Charleston	86
TCU	75

== Future fields ==
=== 2026 ===
- Dayton
- Minnesota
- Northwestern
- Oklahoma State
- Utah
- Virginia Tech
- 2 TBD
