= Austin Freeman =

American basketball player and coach

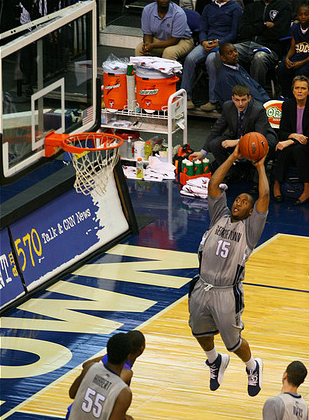
- Freeman with Georgetown in 2007

Morgan State Bears
- Position: Assistant coach
- League: MEAC

Personal information
- Born: May 6, 1989 (age 37) Mitchellville, Maryland, U.S.
- Listed height: 6 ft 3 in (1.91 m)
- Listed weight: 226 lb (103 kg)

Career information
- High school: DeMatha Catholic (Hyattsville, Maryland)
- College: Georgetown (2007–2011)
- NBA draft: 2011: undrafted
- Playing career: 2011–2021
- Coaching career: 2021–present

Career history

Playing
- 2011–2012: Fulgor Libertas Forlì
- 2012–2013: Hapoel Eilat
- 2013: Maccabi Ashdod
- 2013–2014: Iowa Energy
- 2014–2015: Upea Capo d'Orlando
- 2015: Acea Roma
- 2015: Titanes del Distrito Nacional
- 2015–2016: Bermè Viola Reggio Calabria
- 2017–2018: Cañeros del Este
- 2018–2021: San Carlos

Coaching
- 2021-2024: DeMatha Catholic HS (assistant)
- 2024-present: Morgan State (assistant)

Career highlights
- First-team All-Big East (2011); Second-team All-Big East (2010); Big East All-Freshman Team (2008); First-team Parade All-American (2007); McDonald's All-American (2007)

Austin Mambu Freeman Jr. (born May 6, 1989) is an American basketball coach and former player. He is currently an assistant coach at Morgan State University. He played college basketball at Georgetown University.

== High school & college career ==
Freeman attended DeMatha Catholic High School in Hyattsville, Maryland until 2007. In his junior year at DeMatha he averaged 17.9 points, 7.1 rebounds and 3.4 assists per game, while in his senior year he improved his averages to 23.1 points, 7 rebounds and 4 assists per game. He was selected for the McDonald's All-American Game and for the Jordan Brand Classic in 2007.

He played college basketball with Georgetown, playing in the Big East Conference of the NCAA Division I, from 2007 to 2011. Prior to the 2010–11 season, Freeman was named the pre-season Big East Conference Men's Basketball Player of the Year. He would not win the end-of season award, though he did make the All-Big East First Team.

== Professional career ==
Having gone undrafted in the 2011 NBA draft, Freeman signed with Fulgor Libertas Forlì of the Italian second division in July 2011. He was released by the side in March 2012.

Freeman joined the New Orleans Hornets for the 2012 NBA Summer League. In August 2012, he signed with Hapoel Eilat of the Israeli Basketball Premier League. In January 2013, he left Hapoel and moved to fellow Israeli side Maccabi Ashdod.

He joined the Indiana Pacers for the 2013 NBA Summer League, later re-signing with Maccabi Ashdod. After playing six games, he left the club in mid-November 2013, signing with the Iowa Energy of the NBA Development League later that month.

On 27 June 2014, he signed a two-year deal with Upea Capo d'Orlando of the Italian Serie A. He left the side to join Acea Roma on 27 February 2015. At the end of the Serie A season, in May 2015, Freeman joined the Titanes del Licey of the Dominican Republic's LNB.

On 6 July 2015, he signed a one-year deal with Bermè Viola Reggio Calabria of the Italian second division Serie A2.

On November 1, 2016, Freeman was acquired by the Long Island Nets of the NBA Development League, but was waived on November 15 before playing a game for the Nets.

In June 2017, he joined the Cañeros del Este of Dominican Republic for the 2017 LNB season.

In April 2018, Freeman signed with San Carlos of the Dominican Torneo de Baloncesto Superior (TBS), making his debut on April 27 in an 89–88 win over Mauricio Baez.

=== The Basketball Tournament ===
Austin Freeman played for Jack Attack in the 2018 edition of The Basketball Tournament. He scored 9 points and had 2 assists in the team's first-round loss to Hall In.

== Coaching career ==
Freeman became an assistant coach at the conclusion of his playing career, first at DeMatha Catholic, and eventually at Morgan State University in 2024.

== Personal life ==
He was born to Austin and Edith (née Bestman) and has a sister named Austina. During his junior year at Georgetown, Freeman was diagnosed with Type 1 Diabetes.
