= Ashton Gibbs =

American professional basketball player (born 1990)

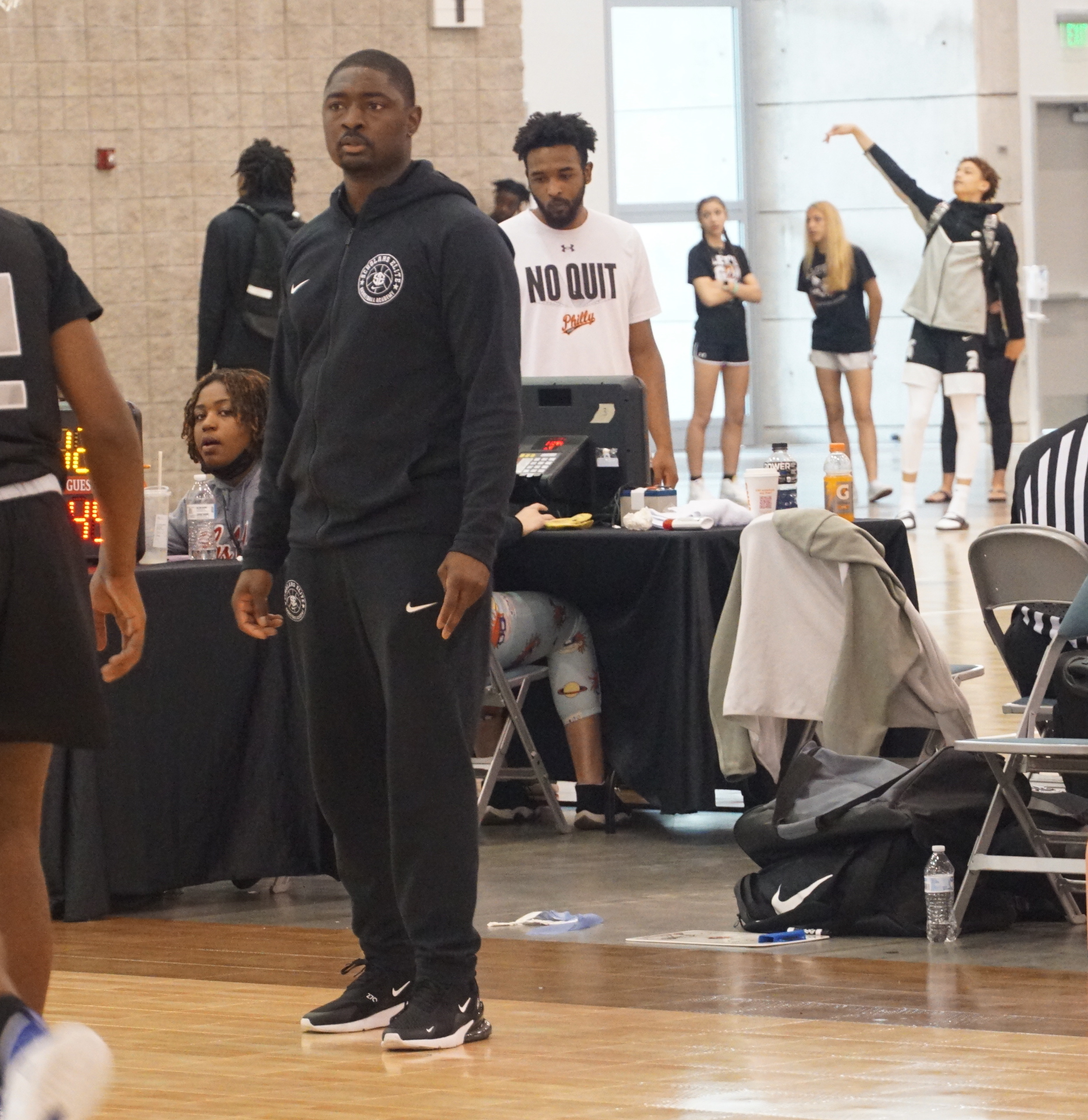
- Ashton Gibbs Coaching at the Nike EYBL.

Capital City Go-Go
- Title: Assistant coach
- League: NBA G League

Personal information
- Born: January 19, 1990 (age 36) Scotch Plains, New Jersey, U.S.
- Listed height: 6 ft 2 in (1.88 m)
- Listed weight: 190 lb (86 kg)

Career information
- High school: Seton Hall Prep (West Orange, New Jersey)
- College: Pittsburgh (2008–2012)
- NBA draft: 2012: undrafted
- Playing career: 2012–2018
- Position: Point guard

Career history

Playing
- 2012: Panionios
- 2013: Ourense
- 2013: Steaua București
- 2014: Hoops Club
- 2016: Vaqueros de Agua Prieta
- 2018: Kangoeroes Willebroek

Coaching
- 2022–2025: College Park Skyhawks (assistant)
- 2025–present: Capital City Go-Go (assistant)

Career highlights
- First-team All-Big East (2011); Second-team All-Big East (2010)
Medals
Men's basketball
Representing the United States
U-19 World Championship
Gold medal – first place	2009 New Zealand	Team

Ashton Gibbs (born January 19, 1990) is an American former professional basketball player and current assistant coach for the Capital City Go-Go of the NBA G League.

== College career ==
After graduating from Seton Hall Preparatory School in West Orange, New Jersey in 2008, Gibbs played college basketball with the Pittsburgh Panthers men's basketball team. In 2010–11, Gibbs was an All-Big East First Team selection and an Associated Press Honorable Mention All-American, while in 2009–10, he was named Big East Conference Most Improved Player and All-Big East Second Team.

Gibbs became a starter in his sophomore season, averaging 15.7 points per game, on 39.7% shooting from the field. He played an average of 34.6 minutes per game for the Panthers during the 2009–10 season.

Gibbs entered his senior season at the University of Pittsburgh selected as the 2011–12 Preseason Big East Player of the Year. The Panthers had a less than stellar 2011–12 season, finishing 22–17, but only 5–13 in Big East play, as they failed to make the NCAA tournament and NIT, and instead landed in the CBI, which they won. He averaged 14.6 points per game with a .382 FG% and a .345 3P%.

== Professional career ==
Gibbs was a projected pick in the 2012 NBA draft, but went undrafted. Gibbs joined the Brooklyn Nets for the 2012 NBA Summer League. On August 9, 2012, he signed with Panionios of Greece for the 2012–13 season. In December 2012, he left Panionios after eight league games and four Eurocup games. In February 2013, he signed with Ourense of Spain for the rest of the season.

On September 25, 2013, Gibbs signed with Steaua București of Romania for the 2013–14 season. In December 2013, he left Steaua after 12 games. In February 2014, he signed with Hoops Club of Lebanon for the rest of the season.

On November 1, 2014, Gibbs was selected by the Sioux Falls Skyforce in the fifth round of the 2014 NBA Development League Draft.

On October 31, 2016, Gibbs was acquired by the Fort Wayne Mad Ants.

== International career ==
In the summer of 2009, Gibbs was a member of the Under-19 junior USA Basketball Team that won the gold medal, and finished with an undefeated 9–0 record at the FIBA Under-19 World Championship in Auckland, New Zealand. He averaged 9.8 points per game, had 20 assists, and led the team in minutes per game (22.4).

Gibbs was also a member of the 2011 USA Basketball Team that competed in the World University Games held in Shenzhen, China. The team finished in fifth place, but tied for the tournament's best record at 7–1. During the games, Gibbs averaged a team-high 21.8 minutes played, 11.6 points per game, shot 46.6% in field goal accuracy (34/73), 95.0% in free throw accuracy (19/20), and had a team-high 2.3 assists per game.

== Coaching career ==
After his playing career ended, Gibbs turned to coaching. In 2022 he was named an assistant for the College Park Skyhawks of the NBA G League. In 2025, he moved to the Capital City Go-Go in a similar role.

== Personal ==
Gibbs is the son of Temple and Jacqueline Gibbs, and has two younger brothers, T. J. and Sterling, who both also played basketball for Seton Hall Prep. Sterling played collegiately at Texas, Seton Hall, and Connecticut and T.J. played collegiately for Notre Dame. His father played football at Temple University.
