= Chris Wright (basketball, born 1989) =

American basketball player

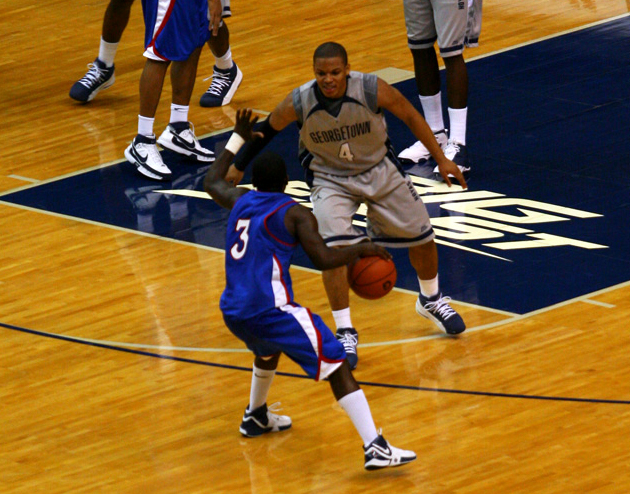
- Wright of Georgetown guards against American University in 2007

Personal information
- Born: November 4, 1989 (age 37) Bowie, Maryland, U.S.
- Listed height: 6 ft 1 in (1.85 m)
- Listed weight: 203 lb (92 kg)

Career information
- High school: St. John's College HS (Washington, D. C.)
- College: Georgetown (2007–2011)
- NBA draft: 2011: undrafted
- Playing career: 2011–2023
- Position: Point Guard

Career history
- 2011–2012: Olin Edirne
- 2012–2013: Iowa Energy
- 2013: Dallas Mavericks
- 2013: Capitanes de Arecibo
- 2013–2014: ASVEL
- 2014: Bakersfield Jam
- 2015: VL Pesaro
- 2015–2016: Hapoel Holon
- 2016: Varese
- 2016–2017: Auxilium Torino
- 2017–2018: Reggiana
- 2018–2019: Trieste
- 2019–2020: Twarde Pierniki Toruń
- 2020–2021: Afyon Belediye
- 2021–2022: Tortona
- 2022: Dorados de Chihuahua
- 2022–2023: Zaragoza

Career highlights
- All-FIBA Europe Cup Team (2016); NBA Development League All-Star (2013); Turkish Super League assists leader (2021); Second-team Parade All-American (2007); McDonald's All-American (2007)
- Stats at NBA.com
- Stats at Basketball Reference

Christopher Taylor Wright (born November 4, 1989) is an American former professional basketball player who last played for Basket Zaragoza of the Spanish Liga ACB. When he played for the Dallas Mavericks in 2013, he became the first known player in NBA history to have been diagnosed with multiple sclerosis.

== High school career ==
Wright played for St. John's College High School and he was the first three-time Washington Post All-Met selection since Adrian Dantley starred at DeMatha Catholic High School from 1971 to 1973.

He scored 2,580 career points for St. John's, leaving as the all-time leader in points. Wright averaged 30.5 points, 4.9 rebounds and 4.3 assists in 2006–07. He topped the 30-point mark 19 times and led the Cadets (24–9) to the Washington Catholic Athletic Conference title game where St. John's fell to Dematha.

Wright was a McDonald's All-American, won the three-point shooting contest at the McDonald's All-American Classic, played in the Jordan Brand Classic in New York, was named the Gatorade Washington, D.C. Player of the Year as a senior, and he averaged over 22 points in both his sophomore and junior seasons. Considered a four-star recruit by Rivals.com, Wright was listed as the No. 8 point guard and the No. 55 player in the nation in 2007.

== College career ==
=== Injuries ===
On September 27, 2007, it was announced that Wright had broken his ankle during a pick up game, and that he would miss the "early part of the season". Despite this, he was able to play the first eleven games of the 2007–08 season, where he averaged 6.2 points a game. Wright reinjured his ankle in December 2007, and missed the next eighteen games. On March 13, 2008, Wright made his first appearance since the injury, playing in the second round of the Big East tournament against Villanova University, scoring six points.

On February 23, 2011, Chris Wright injured the third metacarpal bone in his left (non-shooting) hand and had surgery the following morning, forcing him to miss the final three regular season games of his senior career but leaving him eligible to return for the NCAA tournament.

==== Statistics ====
In his senior season, Chris Wright was among the top 20 Big East players in points per game, free throw percentage, 3-point percentage, steals per game, assists per turnover, and assists per game. Wright's single-game career highs at Georgetown University are 34 points (12/23/09, v. Harvard), 12 assists (12/12/10, v. Appalachian St & 11/18 v. Coastal Carolina), and 7 rebounds (12/20/08, v. Mt. St. Mary's).

== Professional career ==
In August 2011, Wright signed with Olin Edirne of the Turkish Basketball League.

On October 1, 2012, Wright signed a non-guaranteed contract with the New Orleans Hornets. He did not make the final roster.

As an affiliate player, Wright joined the Iowa Energy for 2012–13.

On February 14, 2013, Wright was named to the Prospects All-Star roster for the 2013 NBA D-League All-Star Game as a replacement for Terrence Jones.

On March 13, 2013, Wright signed a 10-day contract with the Dallas Mavericks. Wright became the first known NBA player with multiple sclerosis. He played three games for Dallas before his contract expired. He then returned to the Iowa Energy. In April 2013, he signed with the Capitanes de Arecibo in Puerto Rico.

On September 29, 2013, he signed a one-year deal with ASVEL Basket.

On October 31, 2014, Wright was reacquired by the Iowa Energy. However, he was later waived by the Energy on November 14, 2014. Five days later, he was acquired by the Bakersfield Jam. On December 29, 2014, he was waived by the Jam after appearing in 14 games. On January 7, 2015, he signed with Victoria Libertas Pesaro of Italy for the rest of the 2014–15 Lega Basket Serie A season.

On August 11, 2015, Wright signed with Hapoel Holon of Israel for the 2015–16 season. On February 1, 2016, he left Holon and signed with Pallacanestro Varese of Italy for the rest of the 2015–16 Lega Basket Serie A season.

On August 29, 2016, Wright inked a deal with Guaros de Lara of the Venezuelan Liga Profesional de Baloncesto, but two days later, on September 1, 2016, he signed with Auxilium CUS Torino of Italy for the 2016–17 Lega Basket Serie A season.

On November 5, 2017, Wright signed with Pallacanestro Reggiana for the rest of the 2017–18 Lega Basket Serie A season.

On July 5, 2018, Wright signed a deal with Pallacanestro Trieste.

On August 23, 2019, he has signed with Twarde Pierniki Toruń of the Polish Basketball League. Wright averaged 18.6 points, 6.7 assist and 2 steals per game. On July 30, 2020, Wright signed with Afyon Belediye of the Turkish Basketbol Süper Ligi.

On July 13, 2021, Wright signed with the newly promoted Derthona Basket of the Italian Lega Basket Serie A.

== The Basketball Tournament (TBT) ==
In the summer of 2017, Wright, for the third year, competed in The Basketball Tournament on ESPN for the City of Gods. In their first-round matchup, Wright scored 11 points and grabbed five rebounds in the City of Gods' 88–86 loss to Gael Nation, a team composed of Iona College basketball alum. Wright also played for the City of Gods in 2016. That summer, he averaged 15.0 points, 5.8 rebounds and 5.0 assists per game to help the City of Gods advance to the semifinals where they were defeated by eventual champions Overseas Elite. In 2015, Wright played for DMV's Finest and averaged 13.7 points, 6.3 assists and 4.7 rebounds over the course of three games.

== NBA career statistics ==
Legend
GP	Games played	GS	Games started	MPG	Minutes per game
FG%	Field goal percentage	3P%	3-point field goal percentage	FT%	Free throw percentage
RPG	Rebounds per game	APG	Assists per game	SPG	Steals per game
BPG	Blocks per game	PPG	Points per game	**Bold**	Career high

=== Regular season ===
Year	Team	GP	GS	MPG	FG%	3P%	FT%	RPG	APG	SPG	BPG	PPG
2012–13	Dallas	3	0	1.3	.500	.000	.000	.0	.0	.0	.0	.7
Career		3	0	1.3	.500	.000	.000	.0	.0	.0	.0	.7
