= 2010–11 West Virginia Mountaineers men's basketball team =

American college basketball season

2010–11 West Virginia Mountaineers men's basketball

NCAA tournament, Round of 32
- Conference: Big East Conference

Ranking
- AP: No. 22
- Record: 21–12 (11–7 Big East)
- Head coach: Bob Huggins (4th season)
- Assistant coaches: Billy Hahn; Larry Harrison; Erik Martin
- Home arena: WVU Coliseum

2010–11 Big East men's basketball standings
	Conf.				Overall
Team	W		L	PCT	W		L	PCT
No. 4 Pittsburgh	15	–	3	.833	28	–	6	.824
No. 5 Notre Dame	14	–	4	.778	27	–	7	.794
*No. 12 Syracuse	12	–	6	.667	27	–	8	.771
No. 14 Louisville	12	–	6	.667	25	–	10	.714
No. 18 St. John's	12	–	6	.667	21	–	12	.636
Cincinnati	11	–	7	.611	26	–	9	.743
No. 22 West Virginia	11	–	7	.611	21	–	12	.636
Georgetown	10	–	8	.556	21	–	11	.656
No. 9 Connecticut†	9	–	9	.500	32	–	9	.780
Villanova	9	–	9	.500	21	–	12	.636
Marquette	9	–	9	.500	22	–	15	.595
Seton Hall	7	–	11	.389	13	–	18	.419
Rutgers	5	–	13	.278	15	–	17	.469
Providence	4	–	14	.222	15	–	17	.469
South Florida	3	–	15	.167	10	–	23	.303
DePaul	1	–	17	.056	7	–	24	.226
† 2011 Big East tournament winner As of April 4, 2011; *Syracuse:: 7 wins vacated due to sanctions against the program; Disputed record: Syracuse–(27–8)(10–6); Rankings from AP Poll

The 2010–11 West Virginia Mountaineers men's basketball team represented West Virginia University in the 2010-11 NCAA Division I men's basketball season. They were coached by Bob Huggins and played their home games at the WVU Coliseum. They lost in the 2nd round by Marquette in the 2011 Big East men's basketball tournament. They were invited to the 2011 NCAA Division I men's basketball tournament. They defeated Clemson in the second round before losing to Kentucky in the third round.

== Preseason ==
=== Recruiting ===
College recruiting information
Name	Hometown	School	Height	Weight	Commit date
Kevin Noreen; PF	Minneapolis, MN	Minnesota Transitions Charter	6 ft 10 in (2.08 m)	210 lb (95 kg)	Jun 29, 2010
Kevin Noreen; PF	Recruit ratings: Scout: Rivals: (N/A)				
Overall recruit ranking:
Note: In many cases, Scout, Rivals, 247Sports, On3, and ESPN may conflict in their listings of height and weight.; In these cases, the average was taken. ESPN grades are on a 100-point scale.; Sources: "West Virginia Basketball Commitments". Rivals.; "2010 West Virginia Basketball Commits". Scout.; "ESPN". ESPN.; "Scout.com Team Recruiting Rankings". Scout.; "2010 Team Ranking". Rivals.

== Roster ==
Name	Number	Position	Height	Weight	Year	Hometown
Darryl Bryant	25	G	6–2	195	Junior	Brooklyn, New York
Craig Carey	15	G	6–2	160	Sophomore	Morgantown, West Virginia
Jake Ferguson	20	F	6–6	190	Freshman	Summersville, West Virginia
John Flowers	41	F	6–7	215	Senior	Waldorf, Maryland
Danny Jennings	30	F	6–8	260	Sophomore	Staten Island, New York
Kevin Jones	5	F	6–8	260	Junior	Mount Vernon, New York
Deniz Kılıçlı	13	F	6–9	270	Sophomore	Istanbul, Turkey
Joe Mazzulla	21	G	6–2	200	Redshirt-Senior	Johnston, Rhode Island
Casey Mitchell	33	G	6–4	225	Senior	Savannah, Georgia
Kevin Noreen	34	F	6–10	235	Freshman	Minneapolis, Minnesota
Dalton Pepper	32	G	6–5	230	Sophomore	Levittown, Pennsylvania
Kenny Ross	12	G	6–0	175	Redshirt–Freshman	Furlong, Pennsylvania
Kerwin Selby	24	G	6–4	210	Junior	Bel Air, Maryland
Cam Thoroughman	2	F	6–7	235	Redshirt-Senior	Portsmouth, Ohio
Jonnie West	4	G	6–3	195	Redshirt-Senior	Memphis, Tennessee

== 2010–11 Schedule ==
Date time, TV	Rank^{#}	Opponent^{#}	Result	Record	Site (attendance) city, state
Exhibition
11/02/2010*; 7:00 pm		UNC Pembroke	W 87–53	—	WVU Coliseum; Morgantown, WV
Regular season
11/12/2010*; 9:00 pm		Oakland	W 95–71	1–0	WVU Coliseum (12,707); Morgantown, WV
11/18/2010*; 7:00 pm, ESPNU		vs. Davidson; Puerto Rico Tip-Off First Round	W 84–70	2–0	José Miguel Agrelot Coliseum (4,018); San Juan, PR
11/19/2010*; 11:30 am, ESPNU		vs. Vanderbilt; Puerto Rico Tip-Off Semifinals	W 74–71	3–0	José Miguel Agrelot Coliseum (10,127); San Juan, PR
11/21/2010*; 7:30 pm, ESPN2		vs. Minnesota; Puerto Rico Tip-Off championship	L 70–74	3–1	José Miguel Agrelot Coliseum (11,575); San Juan, PR
11/27/2010*; 7:00 pm, Big East Network		vs. VMI	W 82–66	4–1	Charleston Civic Center (12,367); Charleston, WV
12/01/2010*; 7:00 pm, Big East Network		American	W 71–50	5–1	WVU Coliseum (7,390); Morgantown, WV
12/04/2010*; 4:00 pm, Big East Network		at Miami (FL)	L 76–79	5–2	BankUnited Center (6,548); Coral Gables, FL
12/07/2010*; 7:00 pm, Big East Network		Robert Morris	W 82–49	6–2	WVU Coliseum (6,443); Morgantown, WV
12/12/2010*; 7:00 pm, CBSCS		at Duquesne	W 64–61	7–2	CONSOL Energy Center (8,509); Pittsburgh, PA
12/18/2010*; 2:00 pm, Big East Network		Cleveland State	W 74–63	8–2	WVU Coliseum (11,235); Morgantown, WV
12/22/2010*; 7:00 pm		Walsh; Exhibition	W 86–63	—	WVU Coliseum; Morgantown, WV
12/29/2010; 7:00 pm, Big East Network		St. John's	L 71–81	8–3 (0–1)	WVU Coliseum (11,138); Morgantown, WV
01/01/2011; 11:00 am, ESPN2		at Marquette	L 74–79	8–4 (0–2)	Bradley Center (15,575); Milwaukee, WI
01/04/2011; 9:00 pm, Big East Network		at DePaul	W 67–65	9–4 (1–2)	Allstate Arena (8,189); Rosemont, IL
01/08/2011; 11:00 am, ESPN2		at No. 13 Georgetown	W 65–59	10–4 (2–2)	Verizon Center (13,603); Washington, D.C.
01/13/2011; 7:00 pm, ESPN2		Providence	W 93–63	11–4 (3–2)	WVU Coliseum (11,052); Morgantown, WV
01/16/2011*; 1:30 pm, CBS		No. 8 Purdue	W 68–64	12–4	WVU Coliseum (14,173); Morgantown, WV
01/19/2011*; 8:00 pm	No. 21	vs. Marshall; Chesapeake Energy Capital Classic	L 71–75	12–5	Charleston Civic Center (12,380); Charleston, WV
01/23/2011; 2:00 pm, Big East Network	No. 21	South Florida	W 56–46	13–5 (4–2)	WVU Coliseum (10,744); Morgantown, WV
01/26/2011; 7:00 pm, ESPNU		at No. 19 Louisville	L 54–55	13–6 (4–3)	KFC Yum! Center (21,957); Louisville, KY
01/29/2011; 8:00 pm, Big East Network		at Cincinnati	W 66–55	14–6 (5–3)	Fifth Third Arena (13,176); Cincinnati, OH
02/02/2011; 7:00 pm, Big East Network	No. 25	Seton Hall	W 56–44	15–6 (6–3)	WVU Coliseum (9,729); Morgantown, WV
02/05/2011; 12:00 pm, ESPN	No. 25	at No. 12 Villanova	L 50–66	15–7 (6–4)	Wells Fargo Center (16,106); Philadelphia, PA
02/07/2011; 7:00 pm, ESPN	No. 25	No. 4 Pittsburgh; Backyard Brawl	L 66–71	15–8 (6–5)	WVU Coliseum (14,175); Morgantown, WV
02/12/2011; 4:00 pm, Big East Network	No. 25	DePaul	W 82–71	16–8 (7–5)	WVU Coliseum (11,210); Morgantown, WV
02/14/2011; 7:00 pm, ESPN		at No. 20 Syracuse	L 52–63	16–9 (7–6)	Carrier Dome (22,669); Syracuse, NY
02/19/2011; 1:00 pm, CBS		No. 7 Notre Dame	W 72–58	17–9 (8–6)	WVU Coliseum (12,298); Morgantown, WV
02/24/2011; 9:00 pm, ESPN		at No. 6 Pittsburgh; Backyard Brawl	L 58–71	17–10 (8–7)	Petersen Events Center (12,876); Pittsburgh, PA
02/27/2011; 12:00 pm, Big East Network		at Rutgers	W 65–54	18–10 (9–7)	Louis Brown Athletic Center (7,752); Piscataway, NJ
03/02/2011; 7:00 pm, ESPN2		No. 16 Connecticut	W 65–56	19–10 (10–7)	WVU Coliseum (13,241); Morgantown, WV
03/05/2011; 7:00 pm, ESPN		No. 11 Louisville	W 72–70	20–10 (11–7)	WVU Coliseum (15,032); Morgantown, WV
Big East tournament
03/08/2011; 9:30 pm, ESPN	(6)	vs. (11) Marquette; Big East Second Round	L 61–67	20–11	Madison Square Garden (19,375); New York City, NY
NCAA tournament
03/17/2011*; 12:15 pm, CBS	(5 E) No. 22	vs. (12 E) Clemson; NCAA Second Round	W 84–76	21–11	St. Pete Times Forum (14,835); Tampa, FL
03/19/2011*; 12:15 pm, CBS	(5 E) No. 22	vs. (4 E) No. 11 Kentucky; NCAA Third Round	L 63–71	21–12	St. Pete Times Forum (17,771); Tampa, FL
*Non-conference game. ^{#}Rankings from AP Poll. (#) Tournament seedings in parentheses. E=NCAA East Regional. All times are in Eastern Time.
