= 2010–11 Providence Friars men's basketball team =

American college basketball season

2010–11 Providence Friars men's basketball
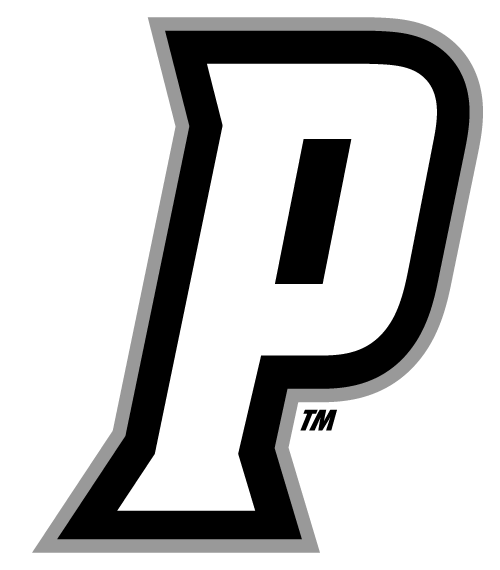
- Conference: Big East Conference
- Record: 15–17 (4–14 Big East)
- Head coach: Keno Davis
- Assistant coaches: Chris Davis; Rodell Davis; Chris Driscoll
- MVP: Marshon Brooks
- Home arena: Dunkin' Donuts Center

2010–11 Big East men's basketball standings
	Conf.				Overall
Team	W		L	PCT	W		L	PCT
No. 4 Pittsburgh	15	–	3	.833	28	–	6	.824
No. 5 Notre Dame	14	–	4	.778	27	–	7	.794
*No. 12 Syracuse	12	–	6	.667	27	–	8	.771
No. 14 Louisville	12	–	6	.667	25	–	10	.714
No. 18 St. John's	12	–	6	.667	21	–	12	.636
Cincinnati	11	–	7	.611	26	–	9	.743
No. 22 West Virginia	11	–	7	.611	21	–	12	.636
Georgetown	10	–	8	.556	21	–	11	.656
No. 9 Connecticut†	9	–	9	.500	32	–	9	.780
Villanova	9	–	9	.500	21	–	12	.636
Marquette	9	–	9	.500	22	–	15	.595
Seton Hall	7	–	11	.389	13	–	18	.419
Rutgers	5	–	13	.278	15	–	17	.469
Providence	4	–	14	.222	15	–	17	.469
South Florida	3	–	15	.167	10	–	23	.303
DePaul	1	–	17	.056	7	–	24	.226
† 2011 Big East tournament winner As of April 4, 2011; *Syracuse:: 7 wins vacated due to sanctions against the program; Disputed record: Syracuse–(27–8)(10–6); Rankings from AP Poll

The 2010–11 Providence Friars men's basketball team represented Providence College in the Big East Conference. The team finished with a 4–14 conference record and a 15–17 record overall.

In his third season with the team, head coach Keno Davis returned two starters and just eight players overall after a tumultuous offseason that included the dismissal of the team's leading scorer in 2009–10, forward Jamine Peterson, as well as the transfer or dismissal of three other players.

The Friars were led in scoring by senior forward Marshon Brooks, who finished first the conference and second in Division I with 24.6 points per game. He set conference records for single-game scoring (52 points vs. Notre Dame on February 23) and for single-season conference scoring (468 points). Brooks was named to the All-Big East First Team and the Associated Press All-American Third Team following the season and was a finalist for the 2011 John R. Wooden Award.

After losing their first six conference games, including a narrow home defeat to #5 Pittsburgh on January 4, the Friars managed back-to-back wins over ranked opponents for the first time since 1998. On January 22, they defeated #19 Louisville at home before knocking off #8 Villanova at home on January 26. However, the Friars did not receive votes in either the AP Poll or Coaches' Poll at any point in the season.

The Friars lost seven of their final eight regular season conference games, finishing 14th in the conference before falling to Marquette in the first round of the 2011 Big East men's basketball tournament. Davis was fired three days later.

== Offseason ==
On the morning of April 12, 2010 two freshmen – center James Still and guard Johnnie Lacy – were arrested outside of campus after Lacy and Still randomly attacked another student on the street. Lacy and Still were charged with assault and suspended from the school the same day; Lacy had already planned on transferring at the end of the spring semester. Fellow freshman guard Duke Mondy was detained for questioning, but was not charged. Still was later dismissed from the school.

On May 18, 2010, sophomore forward Jamine Peterson – the Friars' leading scorer in 2009–10 and an All-Big East Honorable Mention – announced to SLAM Magazine that he was turning professional and would pursue playing opportunities overseas. The same day, the school announced Peterson was dismissed from the team for a team rules violation, which was later revealed to have been an on-campus incident involving Peterson and AAU players from Boston on April 23 or 24, 2010.

On the morning of July 18, 2010, redshirt freshman forward Kadeem Batts was arrested outside of a Providence nightclub and was charged with disorderly conduct and failing to disperse after he did not follow police orders to leave the area. The charges were dismissed after six months.

The Friars also lost two graduating starting guards, Sharaud Curry and Brian McKenzie, as well as graduating reserve guard Luke Burchett. Center Ray Hall graduated but returned to the team for a fifth year of eligibility, while junior forward Russ Permenter transferred after one season with the Friars. In addition, assistant coach Pat Skerry was hired by Pittsburgh head coach Jamie Dixon as an assistant coach on May 27. He was replaced by Boston AAU coach Chris Driscoll, who coached Class of 2010 recruits Gerard Coleman and Ron Giplaye. Also hired as Director of Player Development and Video Operations was former NBA player Kevin Gamble, who played for Keno Davis' father Tom Davis at Iowa.

A week after Skerry's departure, 2011 recruit Naadir Tharpe, a guard rated 4/5 stars by Rivals.com who had committed in March 2010, decommitted from Providence due to Skerry's departure. The next day, June 3, the team lost another 4-star recruit by Rivals.com from the 2010 class, guard Joe Young. However, the school did not allow Young to be released from his signed National Letter of Intent; his family stated Young "would never play at Providence." Young later enrolled in the University of Houston, where is father, Michael, was the school's Director of Basketball Operations. Due to NCAA regulations, Young sat out his first year at Houston before returning for three seasons of eligibility.

During the 2010–11 season, Providence lost a top class of 2012 recruit and Rhode Island native Ricky Ledo, who gave Providence a verbal commitment in December 2010, only to rescind his commitment in January 2011.

== Roster ==
2010–11 Providence Friars men's basketball team
Players
Coaches

Pos.	#	Name	Height	Weight	Year	Previous school	Hometown
G	1	Duke Mondy	6 ft 3 in (1.91 m)	198 lb (90 kg)	So	Catholic Central High School	Grand Rapids, Michigan
G/F	2	Marshon Brooks	6 ft 5 in (1.96 m)	200 lb (91 kg)	Sr	Tucker High School	Stone Mountain, Georgia
G	4	Dre Evans	5 ft 9 in (1.75 m)	167 lb (76 kg)	Fr	David W. Carter High School	Dallas, Texas
F	10	Kadeem Batts	6 ft 9 in (2.06 m)	250 lb (113 kg)	RS Fr	McEachern High School	Powder Springs, Georgia
F	11	Ron Giplaye	6 ft 6 in (1.98 m)	230 lb (104 kg)	Fr	Notre Dame Prep	Lowell, Massachusetts
G	12	Gerard Coleman	6 ft 4 in (1.93 m)	180 lb (82 kg)	Fr	Tilton School	Boston, Massachusetts
F	13	Brice Kofane (redshirt)	6 ft 8 in (2.03 m)	205 lb (93 kg)	Fr	The Miller School	Yaoundé, Cameroon
G	15	Xavier Davis (W)	5 ft 11 in (1.8 m)	170 lb (77 kg)	RS Fr	Smithfield High School	Smithfield, Rhode Island
F	21	Lee Goldsbrough	6 ft 9 in (2.06 m)	205 lb (93 kg)	Fr	Manchester Magic	Newcastle, England
G	25	Bryce Cotton	6 ft 1 in (1.85 m)	165 lb (75 kg)	Fr	Palo Verde High School	Tucson, Arizona
G	32	Vincent Council	6 ft 2 in (1.88 m)	180 lb (82 kg)	So	The Patterson School	Brooklyn, New York
F	35	Tom Niemeier (W)	6 ft 7 in (2.01 m)	235 lb (107 kg)	Fr	Kauai High School	Lihue, Hawaii
G	41	Chris Carter (W)	6 ft 4 in (1.93 m)	180 lb (82 kg)	Sr	Shepherd Hill Regional High School	Worcester, Massachusetts
F/C	42	Bilal Dixon	6 ft 9 in (2.06 m)	245 lb (111 kg)	RS So	Queen of Peace High School	Jersey City, New Jersey
G	51	Ted Bancroft (W)	6 ft 4 in (1.93 m)	187 lb (85 kg)	Fr	Bishop Stang High School	Marion, Massachusetts
G	53	Mike Murray (W)	6 ft 2 in (1.88 m)	188 lb (85 kg)	Fr	La Salle Institute	Troy, New York
C	55	Ray Hall	7 ft 0 in (2.13 m)	285 lb (129 kg)	RS Sr	J. K. Mullen High School	Denver, Colorado

Head coach

Keno Davis

Assistant coach(es)

Chris Davis
Rodell Davis
Chris Driscoll

Legend

- (C) Team captain
- (S) Suspended
- (I) Ineligible
- (W) Walk-on
- Injured
- Current redshirt

Roster
Last update: 2010-11-16

=== Depth chart ===
Pos.	Starting 5	Bench 1	Bench 2	Bench 3
C	Bilal Dixon	Ray Hall	Lee Goldsbrough
PF	Kadeem Batts	Ron Giplaye	Brice Kofane (redshirt)	Tom Niemeier (W)
SF	Marshon Brooks	Duke Mondy
SG	Gerard Coleman	Bryce Cotton	Chris Carter (W)	Ted Bancroft (W)
PG	Vincent Council	Dre Evans	Xavier Davis (W)	Mike Murray (W)

=== Incoming recruits ===
College recruiting
Name	Hometown	School	Height	Weight	Commit date
Gerard Coleman; SG	Boston, MA	Tilton School	6 ft 4 in (1.93 m)	168 lb (76 kg)	Jun 16, 2009
Gerard Coleman; SG	Recruit ratings: Scout: Rivals: (94)				
Bryce Cotton; PG	Tucson, AZ	Palo Verde HS	6 ft 0 in (1.83 m)	170 lb (77 kg)	Aug 30, 2010
Bryce Cotton; PG	Recruit ratings: No ratings found				
Dre Evans; PG	Dallas, TX	Carter HS	5 ft 10 in (1.78 m)	160 lb (73 kg)	Jun 16, 2010
Dre Evans; PG	Recruit ratings: (87)				
Alex Gavrilovic; C	Strasbourg, France	IMG Academy	6 ft 9 in (2.06 m)	225 lb (102 kg)	May 19, 2010
Alex Gavrilovic; C	Recruit ratings: Rivals: (86)				
Ron Giplaye; PF	Lowell, MA	Notre Dame Prep	6 ft 6 in (1.98 m)	213 lb (97 kg)	Jul 11, 2009
Ron Giplaye; PF	Recruit ratings: Scout: Rivals: (88)				
Lee Goldsbrough; PF	Newcastle upon Tyne	Manchester Magic	6 ft 9 in (2.06 m)	205 lb (93 kg)	Jul 26, 2010
Lee Goldsbrough; PF	Recruit ratings: No ratings found				
Brice Kofane; PF	Yaoundé, Cameroon	The Miller School	6 ft 8 in (2.03 m)	220 lb (100 kg)	Apr 26, 2010
Brice Kofane; PF	Recruit ratings: Scout: Rivals: (90)				
Joe Young; SG	Houston, TX	Yates HS	6 ft 2 in (1.88 m)	175 lb (79 kg)	Sep 15, 2009
Joe Young; SG	Recruit ratings: Scout: Rivals: (93)				
Overall recruit ranking:
Note: In many cases, Scout, Rivals, 247Sports, On3, and ESPN may conflict in their listings of height and weight.; In these cases, the average was taken. ESPN grades are on a 100-point scale.; Sources: "2010 Providence Signees". Rivals.; "2010 Providence Signees". Scout.; "2010 Providence Signees". ESPN.; "Scout.com Team Recruiting Rankings". Scout.; "2010 Team Ranking". Rivals.

== Schedule ==
Date time, TV	Rank^{#}	Opponent^{#}	Result	Record	Site (attendance) city, state
Exhibition games
November 6*; 7:00 pm		Bentley (D-II)	W 83–76		Dunkin' Donuts Center; Providence, RI
Non-conference games
November 13*; 7:00 pm		Dartmouth	W 87–52	1–0	Dunkin' Donuts Center (5,203); Providence, RI
November 15*; 7:00 pm		Yale	W 58–55	2–0	Dunkin' Donuts Center (3,521); Providence, RI
November 18*; 7:00 pm		Morgan State	W 77–55	3–0	Dunkin' Donuts Center (4,620); Providence, RI
November 20*; 7:00 pm		Prairie View A&M	W 78–62	4–0	Dunkin' Donuts Center (5,851); Providence, RI
November 23*; 4:30 pm, CBS College Sports		vs. La Salle; Cancún Challenge	L 73–84	4–1	Aventura Palace (330); Playa del Carmen, Mexico
November 24*; 7:00 pm, CBS College Sports		vs. Wyoming; Cancún Challenge	W 84–77	5–1	Aventura Palace (415); Playa del Carmen, Mexico
November 29*; 7:00 pm		Central Connecticut State	W 92–57	6–1	Dunkin' Donuts Center (3,783); Providence, RI
December 1*; 7:00 pm, Cox Sports		Northeastern	W 77–72	7–1	Dunkin' Donuts Center (4,828); Providence, RI
December 4*; 4:00 pm, Cox Sports		Rhode Island	W 87–74	8–1	Dunkin' Donuts Center (12,410); Providence, RI
December 6*; 7:00 pm		Brown	W 91–64	9–1	Dunkin' Donuts Center (3,641); Providence, RI
December 8*; 7:00 pm		at Boston College	L 86–88	9–2	Conte Forum (5,462); Chestnut Hill, MA
December 11*; 2:00 pm, ESPNU		Alabama	W 82–70	10–2	Dunkin' Donuts Center (8,056); Providence, RI
December 21*; 7:00 pm		Sacred Heart	W 84–76	11–2	Dunkin' Donuts Center (6,075); Providence, RI
Big East regular season
December 28; 9:00 pm, ESPNU		at No. 5 Syracuse	L 74–81	11–3 (0–1)	Carrier Dome (20,388); Syracuse, NY
January 1; 7:00 pm, Cox Sports		St. John's	L 65–67	11–4 (0–2)	Dunkin' Donuts Center (8,157); Providence, RI
January 4; 7:00 pm, Cox Sports		No. 5 Pittsburgh	L 79–83	11–5 (0–3)	Dunkin' Donuts Center (9,181); Providence, RI
January 8; 8:00 pm, Cox Sports		at Rutgers	L 72–85	11–6 (0–4)	Louis Brown Athletic Center (6,520); Piscataway, NJ
January 13; 7:00 pm, ESPN2		at West Virginia	L 63–93	11–7 (0–5)	WVU Coliseum (11,052); Morgantown, WV
January 16; 12:00 pm, ESPN3		at South Florida	L 72–79	11–8 (0–6)	USF Sun Dome (3,526); Tampa, FL
January 22; 5:00 pm, ESPNU		No. 19 Louisville	W 72–67	12–8 (1–6)	Dunkin' Donuts Center (12,051); Providence, RI
January 26; 7:00 pm, Cox Sports		No. 8 Villanova	W 83–68	13–8 (2–6)	Dunkin' Donuts Center (7,927); Providence, RI
January 30; 2:00 pm, Cox Sports		at Seton Hall	L 71–81	13–9 (2–7)	Prudential Center (9,880); Newark, NJ
February 2; 7:00 pm, Cox Sports		South Florida	W 68–63	14–9 (3–7)	Dunkin' Donuts Center (3,785); Providence, RI
February 5; 12:00 pm, Cox Sports		at No. 13 Georgetown	L 81–83	14–10 (3–8)	Verizon Center (16,289); Washington, D.C.
February 13; 7:00 pm, Cox Sports		at No. 10 Connecticut	L 57–75	14–11 (3–9)	Harry A. Gampel Pavilion (10,167); Storrs, CT
February 17; 9:00 pm, ESPN2		DePaul	L 76–79	14–12 (3–10)	Dunkin' Donuts Center (5,021); Providence, RI
February 19; 7:00 pm, ESPNU		Cincinnati	L 81–93 ^{OT}	14–13 (3–11)	Dunkin' Donuts Center (9,432); Providence, RI
February 23; 7:00 pm, Cox Sports		No. 9 Notre Dame	L 93–94	14–14 (3–12)	Dunkin' Donuts Center (11,185); Providence, RI
February 27; 4:00 pm, Cox Sports		at Marquette	L 62–86	14–15 (3–13)	Bradley Center (16,768); Milwaukee, WI
March 2; 7:00 pm, NewsChannel 5		at No. 11 Louisville	L 60–87	14–16 (3–14)	KFC Yum! Center (22,724); Louisville, KY
March 5; 7:00 pm, ESPN3		Rutgers	W 75–74	15–16 (4–14)	Dunkin' Donuts Center (9,088); Providence, RI
Big East tournament
March 8; 9:00 pm, ESPNU		vs. Marquette; First Round	L 66–87	15–17 (4–14)	Madison Square Garden (19,375); New York, NY
*Non-conference game. ^{#}Rankings from AP Poll. (#) Tournament seedings in parentheses. All times are in Eastern Time.

== Awards and honors ==
Recipient	Award(s)
Kadeem Batts	2011 John Zannini Coaches' Award
Marshon Brooks	2011 Associated Press Third Team All-American; 2011 All-Big East First Team; 2011 John R. Wooden Award Top 20 Finalist; 2011 USBWA All-District 1; 2011 NABC Division I All-District 5 First Team; 2011 Jimmy Walker Most Valuable Player Award; February 28: Big East Player of the Week; February 7: Big East Player of the Week; December 13: Big East Player of the Week; 2011 John R. Wooden Award Midseason Top 30 Candidate
Chris Carter	2011 Thomas Ramos Academic Award
Gerard Coleman	2011 Coca-Cola Most Promising Prospect Award; January 24: Big East Rookie of the Week; November 29: Big East Rookie of the Week
Bryce Cotton	2011 Lenny Wilkens Hustle Award
Vincent Council	2011 Ryan Gomes Most Improved Player Award
Ray Hall	2011 Ernie D Team Leader Award
Duke Mondy	2011 Marvin Barnes Defensive Player Award
