= 2010–11 Notre Dame Fighting Irish men's basketball team =

American college basketball season

2010–11 Notre Dame Fighting Irish men's basketball

Old Spice Classic Champions

NCAA Tournament, Round of 32
- Conference: Big East Conference

Ranking
- Coaches: No. 14
- AP: No. 5
- Record: 27–7 (14–4 Big East)
- Head coach: Mike Brey
- Assistant coaches: Anthony Solomon; Rod Balanis; Martin Ingelsby
- Home arena: Purcell Pavilion at the Joyce Center

2010–11 Big East men's basketball standings
	Conf.				Overall
Team	W		L	PCT	W		L	PCT
No. 4 Pittsburgh	15	–	3	.833	28	–	6	.824
No. 5 Notre Dame	14	–	4	.778	27	–	7	.794
*No. 12 Syracuse	12	–	6	.667	27	–	8	.771
No. 14 Louisville	12	–	6	.667	25	–	10	.714
No. 18 St. John's	12	–	6	.667	21	–	12	.636
Cincinnati	11	–	7	.611	26	–	9	.743
No. 22 West Virginia	11	–	7	.611	21	–	12	.636
Georgetown	10	–	8	.556	21	–	11	.656
No. 9 Connecticut†	9	–	9	.500	32	–	9	.780
Villanova	9	–	9	.500	21	–	12	.636
Marquette	9	–	9	.500	22	–	15	.595
Seton Hall	7	–	11	.389	13	–	18	.419
Rutgers	5	–	13	.278	15	–	17	.469
Providence	4	–	14	.222	15	–	17	.469
South Florida	3	–	15	.167	10	–	23	.303
DePaul	1	–	17	.056	7	–	24	.226
† 2011 Big East tournament winner As of April 4, 2011; *Syracuse:: 7 wins vacated due to sanctions against the program; Disputed record: Syracuse–(27–8)(10–6); Rankings from AP Poll

The 2010–11 Notre Dame Fighting Irish men's basketball team represented the University of Notre Dame in the 2010–2011 NCAA Division I basketball season. The Fighting Irish were coached by Mike Brey and played their home games at the Edmund P. Joyce Center in Notre Dame, Indiana. The Fighting Irish are members of the Big East Conference. The team returned three starters from the 2009-10 NCAA Tournament squad, having seen the graduation of long-time starters Luke Harangody and Tory Jackson. They finished the season 27–7, 14–4 in Big East play and lost in the semifinals of the 2011 Big East men's basketball tournament to Louisville. They received an at large bid to the 2011 NCAA Division I men's basketball tournament where they defeated Akron in the second round before being upset by Florida State in the third round.

== Awards and honors ==
- Old Spice Classic Champions
- Associated Press College Basketball Coach of the Year - Mike Brey
- Sports Illustrated National Coach of the Year - Mike Brey
- CBSSports.com National Coach of the Year - Mike Brey
- Big East Coach of the Year - Mike Brey
- Sports Illustrated 2nd Team All-American - Ben Hansbrough
- Big East Player of the Year - Ben Hansbrough
- Unanimous 1st Team All Big East - Ben Hansbrough
- 1st Team All-Academic - Tim Abromaitis
- Big East Scholar-Athlete of the Year - Tim Abromaitis
- 3rd Team All Big East - Tim Abromaitis

== Roster ==
#	Name	Height	Weight (lbs.)	Position	Class	Hometown	Previous Team(s)
0	Eric Atkins	6' 2"	173	G	Fr.	Columbia, MD	Mount Saint Joseph High School
1	Tyrone Nash	6' 8"	232	F	Sr.	Queens, NY	Lawrence Woodmere Academy
5	Tom Kopko	6' 2"	183	G	Sr.	Chicago, IL	St. Laurence HS
12	Alex Dragicevich	6' 8"	215	G	Fr.	Northbrook, IL	Glenbrook North HS
14	Scott Martin	6' 8"	219	G	Sr.	Valparaiso, IN	Valparaiso HS / Purdue
21	Tim Abromaitis	6' 8"	235	F	Sr.	Unionville, CT	Farmington HS
22	Jerian Grant	6' 5"	185	G	Fr.	Bowie, MD	DeMatha
23	Ben Hansbrough	6' 3"	206	G	Sr.	Poplar Bluff, MO	Poplar Bluff HS / Mississippi State
25	Tom Knight	6' 9"	251	F	So.	Dixfield, ME	Dirigo HS
32	Joey Brooks	6' 5"	215	G	So.	Houston, TX	Strake Jesuit College Prep
33	Mike Broghammer	6' 9"	243	F	So.	Orono, MN	Hopkins HS
34	Carleton Scott	6' 7"	217	F	Sr.	San Antonio, TX	James Madison HS
45	Jack Cooley	6' 9"	244	F	So.	Glenview, IL	Glenbrook South HS

== 2010-11 Schedule and results ==
- All times are Eastern

Date time, TV	Rank^{#}	Opponent^{#}	Result	Record	Site (attendance) city, state
Exhibition
11/1/2010*; 7:30pm		Marian	W 85–52	—	Edmund P. Joyce Center (6,542); Notre Dame, IN
11/6/2010*; 7:00pm		Catholic	W 72–47	—	Edmund P. Joyce Center (6,525); Notre Dame, IN
Regular Season
11/12/2010*; 8:30pm		Georgia Southern	W 98–61	1–0	Edmund P. Joyce Center (8,165); Notre Dame, IN
11/14/2010*; 2:00pm		Liberty	W 72–51	2–0	Edmund P. Joyce Center (6,478); Notre Dame, IN
11/17/2010*; 7:30pm		Chicago State	W 102–62	3–0	Edmund P. Joyce Center (6,252); Notre Dame, IN
11/22/2010*; 7:30pm		Maine	W 97–72	4–0	Edmund P. Joyce Center (6,303); Notre Dame, IN
11/25/2010*; 7:00pm, ESPN2		vs. Georgia; Old Spice Classic	W 89–83 ^{2OT}	5–0	ESPN Wide World of Sports Complex (2,973); Orlando, FL
11/26/2010*; 5:00pm, ESPN2		vs. California; Old Spice Classic	W 57–44	6–0	ESPN Wide World of Sports Complex (2,932); Orlando, FL
11/28/2010*; 7:00pm, ESPN2		vs. Wisconsin; Old Spice Classic	W 58–51	7–0	ESPN Wide World of Sports Complex (3,428); Orlando, FL
11/30/2010*; 7:30 pm	No. 25	Indiana State	W 81–72	8–0	Edmund P. Joyce Center (7,080); Notre Dame, IN
12/8/2010*; 9:30 pm, ESPN	No. 23	vs. No. 17 Kentucky; SEC–Big East Challenge	L 58–72	8–1	Freedom Hall (17,404); Louisville, KY
12/11/2010*; 8:30 pm, ESPN2	No. 23	Gonzaga	W 83–79	9–1	Edmund P. Joyce Center (8,570); Notre Dame, IN
12/19/2010*; 4:30 pm, ESPNU	No. 24	Stony Brook	W 88–62	10–1	Edmund P. Joyce Center (6,211); Notre Dame, IN
12/22/2010*; 7:30 pm	No. 22	UMBC	W 93–53	11–1	Edmund P. Joyce Center (6,265); Notre Dame, IN
12/29/2010; 7:00 pm, ESPN2	No. 15	No. 9 Georgetown	W 69–55	12–1 (1–0)	Edmund P. Joyce Center (9,149); Notre Dame, IN
1/1/2011; 3:20 pm, ESPNU	No. 15	at No. 5 Syracuse	L 58–70	12–2 (1–1)	Carrier Dome (23,058); Syracuse, NY
1/4/2011; 7:00 pm, Big East Network	No. 14	No. 8 Connecticut	W 73–70	13–2 (2–1)	Edmund P. Joyce Center (7,291); Notre Dame, IN
1/8/2011; 8:00 pm, ESPNU	No. 14	St. John's	W 76–61	14–2 (3–1)	Edmund P. Joyce Center (8,032); Notre Dame, IN
1/10/2011; 7:00 pm, ESPN2	No. 9	at Marquette	L 57–79	14–3 (3–2)	Bradley Center (16,951); Milwaukee, WI
1/16/2011; 12:00 pm	No. 9	at St. John's	L 54–72	14–4 (3–3)	Madison Square Garden (8,550); New York, NY
1/19/2011; 7:00 pm, ESPN2	No. 16	No. 25 Cincinnati	W 66–58	15–4 (4–3)	Edmund P. Joyce Center (8,309); Notre Dame, IN
1/22/2011; 7:00 pm	No. 16	Marquette	W 80–75	16–4 (5–3)	Edmund P. Joyce Center (9,149); Notre Dame, IN
1/24/2011; 7:00 pm, ESPN	No. 15	at No. 2 Pittsburgh	W 56–51	17–4 (6–3)	Petersen Events Center (12,591); Pittsburgh, PA
2/3/2011; 9:00 pm, ESPN2	No. 9	at DePaul	W 83–58	18–4 (7–3)	Allstate Arena (10,982); Chicago, IL
2/6/2011; 12:00 pm, Big East Network	No. 9	Rutgers	W 76–69	19–4 (8–3)	Edmund P. Joyce Center (8,139); Notre Dame, IN
2/9/2011; 12:00 pm, ESPNU	No. 8	No. 16 Louisville	W 89–79 ^{OT}	20–4 (9–3)	Edmund P. Joyce Center (8,659); Notre Dame, IN
2/12/2011; 12:00 pm, Big East Network	No. 8	at South Florida	W 78–55	21–4 (10–3)	Sun Dome (6,104); Tampa, FL
2/19/2011; 1:00 pm, CBS	No. 8	at West Virginia	L 58–72	21–5 (10–4)	WVU Coliseum (12,298); Morgantown, WV
2/23/2011; 7:00 pm, Big East Network	No. 9	at Providence	W 94–93	22–5 (11–4)	Dunkin' Donuts Center (11,185); Providence, RI
2/26/2011; 7:00 pm, ESPNU	No. 9	Seton Hall	W 60–48	23–5 (12–4)	Edmund P. Joyce Center (9,149); Notre Dame, IN
2/28/2011; 7:00 pm, ESPN	No. 8	No. 19 Villanova	W 93–72	24–5 (13–4)	Edmund P. Joyce Center (9,149); Notre Dame, IN
3/5/2011; 2:00 pm, ESPN	No. 8	at No. 16 Connecticut	W 70–67	25–5 (14–4)	Gampel Pavilion (10,167); Storrs, CT
Big East tournament
3/10/2011; 7:00 pm, ESPN	(2) No. 4	vs. (7) No. 25 Cincinnati; Big East Quarterfinals	W 89–51	26–5	Madison Square Garden (19,375); New York, NY
3/11/2011; 9:00 pm, ESPN	(2) No. 4	vs. (3) No. 14 Louisville; Big East Semifinals	L 77–83 ^{OT}	26–6	Madison Square Garden (19,375); New York, NY
NCAA tournament
3/18/2011*; 1:40 pm, TBS	(2 SW) No. 5	vs. (15 SW) Akron; NCAA Second Round	W 69–56	27–6	United Center (17,352); Chicago, IL
3/20/2011*; 9:40 pm, TBS	(2 SW) No. 5	vs. (10 SW) Florida State; NCAA Third Round	L 57–71	27–7	United Center (18,146); Chicago, IL
*Non-conference game. ^{#}Rankings from AP poll. (#) Tournament seedings in parentheses. SW=NCAA Southwest Regional. All times are in Eastern Time.
