= 2011 Big East men's basketball tournament =

- 2011 Big East tournament logo
- Classification: Division I
- Season: 2010–11
- Teams: 16
- Site: Madison Square Garden; New York City
- Champions: Connecticut (7th title)
- Winning coach: Jim Calhoun (7th title)
- MVP: Kemba Walker (Connecticut)
- Top scorer: Kemba Walker (Connecticut) (130 points)
- Television: ESPN

2010–11 Big East men's basketball standings
	Conf.				Overall
Team	W		L	PCT	W		L	PCT
No. 4 Pittsburgh	15	–	3	.833	28	–	6	.824
No. 5 Notre Dame	14	–	4	.778	27	–	7	.794
*No. 12 Syracuse	12	–	6	.667	27	–	8	.771
No. 14 Louisville	12	–	6	.667	25	–	10	.714
No. 18 St. John's	12	–	6	.667	21	–	12	.636
Cincinnati	11	–	7	.611	26	–	9	.743
No. 22 West Virginia	11	–	7	.611	21	–	12	.636
Georgetown	10	–	8	.556	21	–	11	.656
No. 9 Connecticut†	9	–	9	.500	32	–	9	.780
Villanova	9	–	9	.500	21	–	12	.636
Marquette	9	–	9	.500	22	–	15	.595
Seton Hall	7	–	11	.389	13	–	18	.419
Rutgers	5	–	13	.278	15	–	17	.469
Providence	4	–	14	.222	15	–	17	.469
South Florida	3	–	15	.167	10	–	23	.303
DePaul	1	–	17	.056	7	–	24	.226
† 2011 Big East tournament winner As of April 4, 2011; *Syracuse:: 7 wins vacated due to sanctions against the program; Disputed record: Syracuse–(27–8)(10–6); Rankings from AP Poll

The 2011 Big East men's basketball tournament, a part of the 2010-11 NCAA Division I men's basketball season, took place from March 8–12, 2011, at Madison Square Garden in New York City. This was the third Big East tournament to include all 16 of the conference's teams. The teams finishing 9 through 16 in the regular season standings played first-round games, while teams 5 through 8 received byes to the second round. The top 4 teams during the regular season received double-byes to the quarterfinals. The tournament was won by Connecticut, their seventh title, tying Georgetown for the most championships in Big East Men's Basketball Tournament history. Connecticut guard Kemba Walker was named the tournament MVP.

== Seeds ==
2011 Big East Men's Basketball Tournament seeds
Seed	School	Conf.	Over.	Tiebreaker
1.	‡†Pittsburgh	15–3	27–4	
2.	†Notre Dame	14–4	25–5	
3.	†Louisville	12–6	23–8	2–0 vs. SYR/SJU
4.	†Syracuse	12–6	25–6	1–1 vs. LOU/SJU
5.	#St. John's	12–6	20–10	0–2 vs. LOU/SYR
6.	#West Virginia	11–7	20–10	1–0 vs. CIN
7.	#Cincinnati	11–7	24–7	0–1 vs. WVU
8.	#Georgetown	10–8	21–9	
9.	Connecticut	9–9	21–9	2–1 vs. VILL/MARQ
10.	Villanova	9–9	21–10	1–1 vs. CONN/MARQ
11.	Marquette	9–9	18–13	1–2 vs. CONN/VILL
12.	Seton Hall	7–11	13–17	
13.	Rutgers	5–13	14–16	
14.	Providence	4–14	15–16	
15.	South Florida	3–15	9–23	
16.	DePaul	1–17	7–23	
‡ – Big East regular season champions, and tournament No. 1 seed. † – Received a double-bye in the conference tournament. # – Received a single-bye in the conference tournament. Overall records are as of the end of the regular season.

== Bracket ==
First round Tuesday, March 8
9	#21 Connecticut	97
16	DePaul	71
12	Seton Hall	70
13	Rutgers	76*
10	Villanova	69
15	South Florida	70
11	Marquette	87
14	Providence	66

Second round Wednesday, March 9
8	#22 Georgetown	62
9	#21 Connecticut	79
5	#17 St. John's	65
13	Rutgers	63
7	#25 Cincinnati	87
15	South Florida	61
6	#20 West Virginia	61
11	Marquette	67

Quarterfinals; Thursday, March 10
1	#3 Pittsburgh	74
9	#21 Connecticut	76
4	#11 Syracuse	79
5	#17 St. John's	73
2	#4 Notre Dame	89
7	#25 Cincinnati	51
3	#14 Louisville	81
11	Marquette	56

Semifinals; Friday, March 11
9	#21 Connecticut	76*
4	#11 Syracuse	71
2	#4 Notre Dame	77
3	#14 Louisville	83*

Championship game Saturday, March 12
9	#21 Connecticut	69
3	#14 Louisville	66

=== Championship game ===
ESPN

March 12
9:00 pm

Box Score

(9) #21 Connecticut Huskies 69, (3) #14 Louisville Cardinals 66
Pts: K. Walker 19; Rebs: A. Oriakhi 8 Asts: J. Lamb, K. Walker 3	Pts: P. Knowles 18; Rebs: P. Siva 7 Asts: P. Siva 7 Halftime Score: Connecticut, 38-32

Madison Square Garden - New York, NY
Attendance: 19,375
Referees: Mike Roberts, Ed Corbett, John Gaffney

* Denotes Overtime Game

== Rutgers–St. John's controversy ==
- In a controversial finish to a second round game, St. John's defeated Rutgers, 65–63, allowing the Red Storm to advance to the quarterfinals for the first time since 2003. The final seconds of the game were heavily criticized by analysts, including the live ESPN crew, for a lack of officiating that appeared to hinder the Scarlet Knights' late rally, including two uncalled personal fouls against Red Storm players, and an incident in which St. John's forward Justin Brownlee appeared to prematurely celebrate by traveling, stepping out of bounds, and throwing the ball into the stands with more than a second remaining in the game. Rutgers' head coach Mike Rice Jr. could be seen screaming frantically for an explanation for the missed calls, while officials Jim Burr, Tim Higgins and Earl Walton had already left the court. At end of the game, ESPN analyst Doris Burke was quoted as saying, "this was the bizarrest ending of a game I've ever seen," and in a later post-game analysis that "the officials won't sleep tonight." Analyst Fran Fraschilla also added that the officiating "crew lost its composure." Following the game, the head of the NCAA's officiating arm, John Adams, who is in charge of selecting 98 officials for the NCAA tournament, called the lack of officiating "unacceptable," but would still consider the overall body of work of each official throughout the season to determine whether or not they would be invited to the tournament. Big East commissioner John Marinatto released a statement acknowledging "two separate officiating errors" that occurred at the end of the game, but conceded that "neither error is reviewable or correctable under NCAA playing rules." The following day, the conference announced that all three officials had voluntarily withdrawn themselves from the remainder of the tournament, which was, according to Marinatto, "in the best interests of everyone involved — including coaches, student-athletes, game officials and Big East member institutions."

== See also ==
- 2011 Big East women's basketball tournament
