= 2010–11 Villanova Wildcats men's basketball team =

American college basketball season

2010–11 Villanova Wildcats men's basketball

Philadelphia Big 5 champions

NCAA Tournament, Round of 64
- Conference: Big East Conference
- Record: 21–12 (9–9 Big East)
- Head coach: Jay Wright
- Assistant coaches: Chris Walker; Keith Urgo; Jason Donnelly
- Home arena: The Pavilion; Wells Fargo Center

2010–11 Big East men's basketball standings
	Conf.				Overall
Team	W		L	PCT	W		L	PCT
No. 4 Pittsburgh	15	–	3	.833	28	–	6	.824
No. 5 Notre Dame	14	–	4	.778	27	–	7	.794
*No. 12 Syracuse	12	–	6	.667	27	–	8	.771
No. 14 Louisville	12	–	6	.667	25	–	10	.714
No. 18 St. John's	12	–	6	.667	21	–	12	.636
Cincinnati	11	–	7	.611	26	–	9	.743
No. 22 West Virginia	11	–	7	.611	21	–	12	.636
Georgetown	10	–	8	.556	21	–	11	.656
No. 9 Connecticut†	9	–	9	.500	32	–	9	.780
Villanova	9	–	9	.500	21	–	12	.636
Marquette	9	–	9	.500	22	–	15	.595
Seton Hall	7	–	11	.389	13	–	18	.419
Rutgers	5	–	13	.278	15	–	17	.469
Providence	4	–	14	.222	15	–	17	.469
South Florida	3	–	15	.167	10	–	23	.303
DePaul	1	–	17	.056	7	–	24	.226
† 2011 Big East tournament winner As of April 4, 2011; *Syracuse:: 7 wins vacated due to sanctions against the program; Disputed record: Syracuse–(27–8)(10–6); Rankings from AP Poll

The 2010–11 Villanova Wildcats men's basketball team represented Villanova University in the 2010–11 college basketball season. Villanova was led by head coach Jay Wright. The Wildcats participated in the Big East Conference and played their home games at The Pavilion, with some select home games at the Wells Fargo Center. They finished the season 21–12, 9–9 in Big East play, and lost in the first round of the 2011 Big East men's basketball tournament to South Florida. They received an at-large bid to the 2011 NCAA Division I men's basketball tournament, where they lost in the second round to George Mason.

== Preseason ==
The Villanova Wildcats came back from a 2009–10 season which had a record of 25–8 (13–4), with the season ending in the second round of the NCAA Tournament.

=== Class of 2010 ===
College recruiting
Name	Hometown	School	Height	Weight	Commit date
James Bell; SF	Montverde, Florida	Montverde Academy	6 ft 5 in (1.96 m)	215 lb (98 kg)	Jul 31, 2008
James Bell; SF	Recruit ratings: Scout: Rivals: (95)				
Markus Kennedy; C	Winchendon, Massachusetts	The Winchendon School	6 ft 9 in (2.06 m)	230 lb (100 kg)	Apr 29, 2009
Markus Kennedy; C	Recruit ratings: Scout: Rivals: (92)				
JayVaughn Pinkston; PF	Brooklyn, New York	Bishop Loughlin	6 ft 9 in (2.06 m)	220 lb (100 kg)	Dec 3, 2009
JayVaughn Pinkston; PF	Recruit ratings: Scout: Rivals: (94)				
Overall Recruiting Rankings: Scout – UR Rivals – NR ESPN – NR

== Season ==
The Wildcats recorded home wins against Temple and UCLA in their out-of-conference schedule, with their only loss coming on the road to Tennessee. They reached as high as #7 in the AP Poll, starting the season 16–1. However, in their fifth Big East contest, they lost at Connecticut. They quickly bounced back with a road win at Syracuse, who was then ranked nationally No. 3. Maalik Wayns had a team-high 21 points in the win. They then lost their next two games, on the road to Providence, and at home against Georgetown.

As of February 1, Corey Stokes was averaging 15.6 points per game, good for tenth in the Big East. Corey Fisher was a close second on the team, with 15.2 ppg.

Villanova finished the season with an overall record of 21–11 and lost in the first round of the Big East conference tournament to South Florida, 69–70. They received a #9 seed in the NCAA tournament and lost to #8 seed George Mason in the second round.

== Schedule ==
Date time, TV	Rank^{#}	Opponent^{#}	Result	Record	Site (attendance) city, state
Exhibition
11/2/10*; 7:00 pm	No. 6	District of Columbia	W 95–58	—	Wells Fargo Center (5,797); Philadelphia
Regular season
11/12/10*; 8:00 pm, ESPN3	No. 6	Bucknell	W 68–52	1–0	The Pavilion (6,500); Villanova, Pennsylvania
11/16/10*; 5:30 pm, ESPNU	No. 6	Marist; NIT Season Tip-Off first round	W 84–47	2–0	The Pavilion (6,500); Villanova, Pennsylvania
11/17/10*; 8:00 pm	No. 6	Boston University; NIT Season Tip-Off second round	W 82–66	3–0	The Pavilion (6,500); Villanova, Pennsylvania
11/20/10*; 7:00 pm, ESPN3	No. 6	Lafayette	W 86–41	4–0	The Pavilion (6,500); Villanova, Pennsylvania
11/24/10*; 9:00 pm, ESPN	No. 7	vs. UCLA; NIT Season Tip-Off semi-finals	W 82–70	5–0	Madison Square Garden (6,746); New York City
11/26/10*; 5:00 pm, ESPN	No. 7	vs. No. 24 Tennessee; NIT Season Tip-Off final	L 68–78	5–1	Madison Square Garden (7,228); New York City
12/3/10*; 8:45 pm, ESPNU	No. 12	Saint Joseph's; Philadelphia Big 5	W 71–60	6–1	The Pavilion (6,500); Villanova, Pennsylvania
12/8/10*; 7:00 pm, Comcast SportsNet	No. 12	at Penn; Philadelphia Big 5	W 65–53	7–1	The Palestra (5,561); Philadelphia
12/12/10*; 2:00 pm, ESPNU	No. 12	at La Salle; Philadelphia Big 5	W 84–81	8–1	Tom Gola Arena (3,400); Philadelphia
12/18/10*; 7:30 pm, ESPN3	No. 10	Delaware	W 78–59	9–1	Wells Fargo Center (12,055); Philadelphia
12/22/10*; 7:00 pm	No. 8	at Monmouth	W 76–36	10–1	The MAC (3,896); West Long Branch, New Jersey
12/30/10*; 7:00 pm, ESPN2	No. 8	Temple; Philadelphia Big 5	W 78–74	11–1	The Pavilion (6,500); Villanova, Pennsylvania
1/2/11; 1:00 pm, ESPNU	No. 8	Rutgers	W 81–65	12–1 (1–0)	The Pavilion (6,500); Villanova, Pennsylvania
1/6/10; 7:00 pm, ESPNU	No. 7	at South Florida	W 83–71	13–1 (2–0)	USF Sun Dome (4,510); Tampa, Florida
1/9/11; 12:00 pm, WPVI	No. 7	No. 25 Cincinnati	W 72–61	14–1 (3–0)	The Pavilion (6,500); Villanova, Pennsylvania
1/12/11; 7:00 pm, ESPN2	No. 7	No. 17 Louisville	W 88–74	15–1 (4–0)	Wells Fargo Center (13,199); Philadelphia
1/15/11*; 1:00 pm, CBS	No. 7	Maryland	W 74–66	16–1 (4–0)	Wells Fargo Center (17,477); Philadelphia
1/17/11; 3:30 pm, ESPN	No. 7	at No. 8 Connecticut	L 59–61	16–2 (4–1)	Harry A. Gampel Pavilion (10,167); Storrs, Connecticut
1/22/11; 12:30 pm, ESPN	No. 7	at No. 3 Syracuse	W 83–72	17–2 (5–1)	Carrier Dome (33,736); Syracuse, New York
1/26/11; 7:00 pm, WPVI	No. 8	at Providence	L 68–83	17–3 (5–2)	Dunkin' Donuts Center (7,927); Providence, Rhode Island
1/29/11; 12:00 pm, ESPN	No. 8	No. 21 Georgetown	L 66–69	17–4 (5–3)	Wells Fargo Center (19,914); Philadelphia
2/2/11; 7:00 pm, ESPNU	No. 12	Marquette	W 75–70	18–4 (6–3)	The Pavilion (6,500); Villanova, Pennsylvania
2/5/11; 12:00 pm, ESPN2	No. 12	No. 25 West Virginia	W 66–50	19–4 (7–3)	Wells Fargo Center; Philadelphia
2/9/11; 8:00 pm, WPHL	No. 9	at Rutgers	L 76–77	19–5 (7–4)	The RAC (6,892); Piscataway, New Jersey
2/12/11; 9:00 pm, ESPN	No. 9	No. 4 Pittsburgh; ESPN College GameDay	L 54–57	19–6 (7–5)	The Pavilion (6,500); Villanova, Pennsylvania
2/15/11; 8:00 pm, WPHL	No. 15	at Seton Hall	W 60–57	20–6 (8–5)	Prudential Center (9,408); Newark, New Jersey
2/19/11; 12:00 pm, WPVI	No. 15	at DePaul	W 77–75 ^{OT}	21–6 (9–5)	Allstate Arena (9,854); Rosemont, Illinois
2/21/11; 7:00 pm, ESPN	No. 15	No. 17 Syracuse; Big Monday	L 64–69	21–7 (9–6)	Wells Fargo Center (18,899); Philadelphia
2/26/11; 2:00 pm, ESPN	No. 15	No. 23 St John's	L 68–81	21–8 (9–7)	Wells Fargo Center (16,042); Philadelphia, Pennsylvania
2/28/11; 7:00 pm, ESPN	No. 19	at No. 8 Notre Dame; Big Monday	L 72–93	21–9 (9–8)	Edmund P. Joyce Center (9,149); South Bend, Indiana
3/5/11; 4:00 pm, CBS	No. 19	at No. 4 Pittsburgh	L 50–60	21–10 (9–9)	Petersen Events Center (12,843); Pittsburgh
Big East tournament
3/8/11; 7:00 pm, ESPNU	(10)	vs. (15) South Florida; Big East First Round	L 69–70	21–11	Madison Square Garden (19,375); New York
NCAA tournament
3/18/11*; 2:10 pm, TNT	(9 E)	vs. (8 E) George Mason; NCAA Second Round	L 57–61	21–12	Quicken Loans Arena (20,164); Cleveland, Ohio
*Non-conference game. ^{#}Rankings from AP Poll. (#) Tournament seedings in parentheses. E=NCAA East Regional. All times are in Eastern Time.

== Rankings ==
Ranking movement Legend: ██ Improvement in ranking. ██ Decrease in ranking.
Poll	Pre	Wk 1	Wk 2	Wk 3	Wk 4	Wk 5	Wk 6	Wk 7	Wk 8	Wk 9	Wk 10	Wk 11	Wk 12	Wk 13	Wk 14	Wk 15	Wk 16	WK 17	Wk 18	Final
AP	6	6	7	12	12	10	8	8	7	7	7	8	12	9	15	15	19	NR		
Coaches	6	7	7	12	12	11	8	8	7	7	7	7	12	10	14	14	19	NR		

== Roster ==
2010–11 Villanova Wildcats men's basketball team
Players
Coaches

Pos.	#	Name	Height	Weight	Year	Hometown
F	0	Antonio Pena	6 ft 8 in (2.03 m)	235 lb (107 kg)	Sr	Brooklyn, New York
F	1	JayVaughn Pinkston	6 ft 7 in (2.01 m)	260 lb (118 kg)	Fr	Brooklyn, New York
G	2	Maalik Wayns	6 ft 1 in (1.85 m)	185 lb (84 kg)	So	Philadelphia, Pennsylvania
G	4	Dallas Ouando	6 ft 0 in (1.83 m)	190 lb (86 kg)	Jr	Holmdel, New Jersey
G	10	Corey Fisher	6 ft 1 in (1.85 m)	185 lb (84 kg)	Sr	Bronx, New York
F	12	Russell Wooten	6 ft 4 in (1.93 m)	210 lb (95 kg)	GS	Chula Vista, California
F	13	Mouphtaou Yarou	6 ft 9 in (2.06 m)	215 lb (98 kg)	So	Natitingou, Benin
G	23	Dominic Cheek	6 ft 6 in (1.98 m)	185 lb (84 kg)	So	Jersey City, New Jersey
G	24	Corey Stokes	6 ft 5 in (1.96 m)	195 lb (88 kg)	Sr	Bayonne, New Jersey
C	25	Maurice Sutton	6 ft 11 in (2.11 m)	215 lb (98 kg)	So	Upper Marlboro, Maryland
G	32	James Bell	6 ft 5 in (1.96 m)	225 lb (102 kg)	Fr	Orlando, Florida
F	34	Isaiah Armwood	6 ft 7 in (2.01 m)	185 lb (84 kg)	So	Baltimore, Maryland

Head coach

- Jay Wright (Bucknell)

Assistant coach(es)

- Chris Walker (Villanova)
- Doug West (Villanova)
- Jason Donnelly (Muhlenberg)

Legend

- (C) Team captain
- (S) Suspended
- (I) Ineligible
- (W) Walk-on
- Injured
- Current redshirt

Roster
Last update: 2009-11-13
