= 2010–11 South Florida Bulls men's basketball team =

American college basketball season

2010–11 South Florida Bulls men's basketball
- Conference: Big East Conference
- Record: 10–23 (3–15 Big East)
- Head coach: Stan Heath
- Home arena: USF Sun Dome

2010–11 Big East men's basketball standings
	Conf.				Overall
Team	W		L	PCT	W		L	PCT
No. 4 Pittsburgh	15	–	3	.833	28	–	6	.824
No. 5 Notre Dame	14	–	4	.778	27	–	7	.794
*No. 12 Syracuse	12	–	6	.667	27	–	8	.771
No. 14 Louisville	12	–	6	.667	25	–	10	.714
No. 18 St. John's	12	–	6	.667	21	–	12	.636
Cincinnati	11	–	7	.611	26	–	9	.743
No. 22 West Virginia	11	–	7	.611	21	–	12	.636
Georgetown	10	–	8	.556	21	–	11	.656
No. 9 Connecticut†	9	–	9	.500	32	–	9	.780
Villanova	9	–	9	.500	21	–	12	.636
Marquette	9	–	9	.500	22	–	15	.595
Seton Hall	7	–	11	.389	13	–	18	.419
Rutgers	5	–	13	.278	15	–	17	.469
Providence	4	–	14	.222	15	–	17	.469
South Florida	3	–	15	.167	10	–	23	.303
DePaul	1	–	17	.056	7	–	24	.226
† 2011 Big East tournament winner As of April 4, 2011; *Syracuse:: 7 wins vacated due to sanctions against the program; Disputed record: Syracuse–(27–8)(10–6); Rankings from AP Poll

The 2010–11 South Florida Bulls men's basketball team represented the University of South Florida Bulls during the 2010–11 NCAA Division I men's basketball season. This was the 40th season of basketball for USF. The team was coached by Stan Heath in his fourth year at the school. USF played its home games in the USF Sun Dome and is a member of the Big East Conference.

== Off season ==
During the off-season, there were several important milestones for the USF basketball program. In March, ground was broken on the Muma Basketball Center; a 50,000-square-foot (4,600 m^{2}), basketball practice facility, adjacent to the USF Sun Dome. Construction is expected to be completed by the end of spring 2011. In June, Dominique Jones became the highest player ever drafted to the NBA from USF. He was selected in the first round, as the 25th overall pick by the Memphis Grizzlies, and then traded to the Dallas Mavericks. In August, the team represented the United States in Brazil for the 2010 Pan American University Championships. They took home the silver medal, losing in the finals to Brazil, and finishing with a record of 4-1. At Big East Media day in October, the Bulls were selected to finish in 13th place in the Big East Preseason Coaches' Poll.

== Roster ==
#	Name	Position	Height	Weight	Year	Former school	Hometown
1	Ron Anderson	Forward	6–8	255	RS Junior	Kansas State / McCallie School	Upper Marlboro, MD
3	LaVonte Dority	Guard	6–1	195	Freshman	Foreman HS	Chicago, IL
5	Jawanza Poland	Guard	6–4	200	Sophomore	Hutchinson CC / Wichita East	Wichita, KS
10	Anthony Crater	Guard	6–1	170	Junior	Ohio State University / Brewster Academy	Flint, MI
11	Shedrick Haynes	Guard	6–0	180	Junior	Lackawanna College / Booker HS	Sarasota, FL
13	Jordan Heath	Guard	6–0	185	Freshman	Tampa Prep	Detroit, MI
22	Shaun Noriega	Guard	6–4	195	Sophomore	North Port HS	North Port, FL
23	Mike Burwell	Guard	6–6	210	Sophomore	South Kent School / Cardinal McCarrick HS	East Brunswick, NJ
24	Augustus Gilchrist	Forward/Center	6–10	245	Junior	Maryland / Progressive Christian Academy	Clinton, MD
25	Alberto Damour	Forward	6–5	225	Senior	Poinciana HS	Poinciana, FL
31	Jarrid Famous	Forward/Center	6–11	240	Senior	Westchester CC / Blessed Sacrament HS	Bronx, NY
32	Toarlyn Fitzpatrick	Forward	6–8	230	Sophomore	King HS	Tampa, FL
34	Hugh Robertson	Guard	6–6	202	Junior	Tallahassee CC / Northeast HS	Macon, GA
*	Victor Rudd	Forward	6–7	207	Sophomore	Arizona State / Findlay Prep	Los Angeles, CA

* Must sit out due to NCAA transfer rules and will become eligible in Nov. 2011.

== Schedule and results ==
Date time, TV	Rank^{#}	Opponent^{#}	Result	Record	Site city, state
Exhibition
November 1, 2010*; 7:00pm		Eckerd	W 75–58	—	USF Sun Dome; Tampa, FL
Regular Season
November 12, 2010*; 7:00pm		Southern Miss	L 53–60	0–1	USF Sun Dome; Tampa, FL
November 15*; 7:00pm, BHSN		St. Francis Brooklyn	W 74–71	1–1	USF Sun Dome; Tampa, FL
November 18*; 7:00pm, CBS College Sports Network		at UCF	L 59–65	1–2	UCF Arena; Orlando, FL
November 21*; 2:00pm, BHSN		Georgia Southern; South Padre Island Invitational	W 76–63	2–2	USF Sun Dome; Tampa, FL
November 23*; 7:00pm, BHSN		Liberty; South Padre Island Invitational	W 60–43	3–2	USF Sun Dome; Tampa, FL
November 26*; 6:00pm, Fox College Sports		vs. No. 23 BYU; South Padre Island Invitational	L 75–77 ^{2OT}	3–3	South Padre Island Convention Centre; South Padre Island, TX
November 27*; 5:30pm		vs. Texas Tech; South Padre Island Invitational	W 64–61	4–3	South Padre Island Convention Centre; South Padre Island, TX
December 1*; 7:00pm, BHSN		VCU	W 60–59 ^{OT}	5–3	USF Sun Dome; Tampa, FL
December 4*; 8:00pm		at Florida Atlantic	L 42–50	5–4	FAU Arena; Boca Raton, FL
December 12*; 6:30pm, ESPNU		at Kent State	L 51–56	5–5	Memorial Athletic and Convocation Center; Kent, OH
December 15*; 9:00pm, ESPNU		Auburn	W 61–49	6–5	USF Sun Dome; Tampa, FL
December 18*; 7:00pm		James Madison	L 61–66	6–6	USF Sun Dome; Tampa, FL
December 22*; 7:00pm		at Cleveland State	L 62–69	6–7	Wolstein Center; Cleveland, OH
December 28; 7:00pm		at Seton Hall	L 55–64	6–8 (0–1)	Prudential Center; Newark, NJ
December 31; 7:00pm, ESPNU		at No. 4 Connecticut	L 61–66 ^{OT}	6–9 (0–2)	XL Center; Hartford, CT
January 6, 2011; 7:00pm, ESPNU		No. 7 Villanova	L 71–83	6–10 (0–3)	USF Sun Dome; Tampa, FL
January 9; 12:00pm		Louisville	L 77–86	6–11 (0–4)	USF Sun Dome; Tampa, FL
January 12; 7:00pm		at Cincinnati	L 66–74	6–12 (0–5)	Fifth Third Arena; Cincinnati, OH
January 16; 12:00pm, ESPN3		Providence	W 79–72	7–12 (1–5)	USF Sun Dome; Tampa, FL
January 20; 7:00pm, ESPN2		at Rutgers	L 62–71	7–13 (1–6)	Louis Brown Athletic Center; Newark, NJ
January 23; 2:00pm, BHSN		at No. 21 West Virginia	L 46–56	7–14 (1–7)	WVU Coliseum; Morgantown, WV
January 27; 9:00pm, ESPNU		DePaul	W 71–60	8–14 (2–7)	USF Sun Dome; Tampa, FL
February 2; 7:00pm, BHSN		at Providence	L 63–68	8–15 (2–8)	Dunkin' Donuts Center; Providence, RI
February 5; 2:00pm		No. 17 Syracuse	L 49–72	8–16 (2–9)	St. Pete Times Forum; Tampa, FL
February 9; 7:00pm, ESPN2		Marquette	L 58–59	8–17 (2–10)	USF Sun Dome; Tampa, FL
February 12; 12:00pm		No. 8 Notre Dame	L 55–78	8–18 (2–11)	USF Sun Dome; Tampa, FL
February 16; 7:00pm, ESPN3		at No. 4 Pittsburgh	L 55–67	8–19 (2–12)	Petersen Events Center; Pittsburgh, PA
February 19; 7:00pm		No. 9 Georgetown	L 55–61	8–20 (2–13)	USF Sun Dome; Tampa, FL
February 26; 2:00pm		at DePaul	W 86–76	9–20 (3–13)	Allstate Arena; Rosemont, IL
March 2; 9:00pm, ESPNU		No. 4 Pittsburgh	L 50–66	9–21 (3–14)	USF Sun Dome; Tampa, FL
March 5; 8:00pm, BHSN/ESPN3		at No. 15 St. John's	L 56–72	9–22 (3–15)	Carnesecca Arena; Queens, NY
Big East tournament
March 8; 7:00pm, ESPNU	(15)	vs. (10) Villanova; Big East First Round	W 70–69	10–22	Madison Square Garden; New York, NY
March 9; 7:00pm, ESPN	(15)	vs. (7) No. 25 Cincinnati; Big East Second Round	L 61–87	10–23	Madison Square Garden; New York, NY
*Non-conference game. ^{#}Rankings from AP Poll. (#) Tournament seedings in parentheses.
