= 2010–11 St. John's Red Storm men's basketball team =

American college basketball season

2010–11 St. John's Red Storm men's basketball

Great Alaska Shootout Champions MSG Holiday Festival Champions

NCAA Tournament, Round of 64
- Conference: Big East Conference

Ranking
- AP: No. 18
- Record: 21–12 (12–6 Big East)
- Head coach: Steve Lavin (1st year)
- Assistant coaches: Mike Dunlap; Tony Chiles; Rico Hines
- Home arena: Carnesecca Arena; Madison Square Garden

2010–11 Big East men's basketball standings
	Conf.				Overall
Team	W		L	PCT	W		L	PCT
No. 4 Pittsburgh	15	–	3	.833	28	–	6	.824
No. 5 Notre Dame	14	–	4	.778	27	–	7	.794
*No. 12 Syracuse	12	–	6	.667	27	–	8	.771
No. 14 Louisville	12	–	6	.667	25	–	10	.714
No. 18 St. John's	12	–	6	.667	21	–	12	.636
Cincinnati	11	–	7	.611	26	–	9	.743
No. 22 West Virginia	11	–	7	.611	21	–	12	.636
Georgetown	10	–	8	.556	21	–	11	.656
No. 9 Connecticut†	9	–	9	.500	32	–	9	.780
Villanova	9	–	9	.500	21	–	12	.636
Marquette	9	–	9	.500	22	–	15	.595
Seton Hall	7	–	11	.389	13	–	18	.419
Rutgers	5	–	13	.278	15	–	17	.469
Providence	4	–	14	.222	15	–	17	.469
South Florida	3	–	15	.167	10	–	23	.303
DePaul	1	–	17	.056	7	–	24	.226
† 2011 Big East tournament winner As of April 4, 2011; *Syracuse:: 7 wins vacated due to sanctions against the program; Disputed record: Syracuse–(27–8)(10–6); Rankings from AP Poll

The 2010–11 St. John's Red Storm men's basketball team represented St. John's University during the 2010–11 NCAA Division I men's basketball season. The team was coached by Steve Lavin in his first year at the school. Saint John's home games were played at Carnesecca Arena and Madison Square Garden and the team was a member of the Big East Conference. They finished the season 21–12, 12–6 in Big East play and lost in the quarterfinals of the 2011 Big East men's basketball tournament to Syracuse. They received an at-large bid to the 2011 NCAA Division I men's basketball tournament, where they lost in the first round to Gonzaga.

== Off season ==
On March 30, 2010, Lavin was announced as the head coach of St. John's. He replaced Norm Roberts, who was fired after six seasons as the Red Storm head coach. Lavin named his mentor Gene Keady to the position of special assistant.

=== Departures ===
Name	Number	Pos.	Height	Weight	Year	Hometown	Reason for departure
Anthony Mason, Jr.	2	F	6'7"	213	RS senior	Memphis, Tennessee	Graduated
Omari Lawrence	11	G	6'4"	185	Freshman	Bronx, New York	Transferred to Kansas State

=== Class of 2010 signees ===
College recruiting
Name	Hometown	School	Height	Weight	Commit date
Dwayne Polee II; SF	Los Angeles, CA	Westchester High School	6 ft 7 in (2.01 m)	193 lb (88 kg)	May 8, 2010
Dwayne Polee II; SF	Recruit ratings: Scout: Rivals: (92)				
Overall recruit ranking:
Note: In many cases, Scout, Rivals, 247Sports, On3, and ESPN may conflict in their listings of height and weight.; In these cases, the average was taken. ESPN grades are on a 100-point scale.; Sources: "2010 Team Ranking". Rivals.

== Season ==
St. John's had limited success in recent seasons. The Red Storm (17–9, 9–5 Big East) had won games over ranked teams, with wins over Duke, Notre Dame, Connecticut, Georgetown, and Pittsburgh, all of which were in the top 15. The Red Storm were looking for their first NCAA tournament berth since 2002. After defeating then #4 Pittsburgh on February 19, all 63 participating brackets in The Bracket Project placed the Red Storm within the NCAA Tournament.

The Red Storm also achieved their first Top 25 ranking in over a decade; the previous time was on November 28, 2000. On February 21, the Red Storm were ranked #23 in the AP Poll and #25 in the ESPN/USA Today Coaches Poll. They reached as high as #15 in both the AP Poll and the ESPN/USA Today Coaches Poll on February 28 following their road win against Villanova.

== Roster ==
2010–11 St. John's Red Storm men's basketball team
Players
Coaches

Pos.	#	Name	Height	Weight	Year	Previous school	Hometown
F	0	Dwayne Polee II	6 ft 7 in (2.01 m)	193 lb (88 kg)	Fr	Westchester H.S.	Los Angeles, CA
G/F	1	D. J. Kennedy	6 ft 5 in (1.96 m)	214 lb (97 kg)	Sr	Schenley	Pittsburgh, PA
G	3	Malik Boothe	5 ft 9 in (1.75 m)	184 lb (83 kg)	Sr	Christ the King	Queens, NY
F	5	Sean Evans	6 ft 8 in (2.03 m)	259 lb (117 kg)	Sr	Northeast	Philadelphia, PA
G	10	Quincy Roberts	6 ft 5 in (1.96 m)	196 lb (89 kg)	RS So	Harrisburg	Harrisburg, PA
G	12	Dwight Hardy	6 ft 2 in (1.88 m)	187 lb (85 kg)	Sr	Kennedy/Indian Hills C.C.	Bronx, NY
F/C	15	Dele Coker	6 ft 10 in (2.08 m)	257 lb (117 kg)	Sr	South Kent	Lagos, Nigeria
G	23	Paris Horne	6 ft 3 in (1.91 m)	189 lb (86 kg)	Sr	Bridgton Academy	Middletown, DE
F	24	Justin Burrell	6 ft 8 in (2.03 m)	244 lb (111 kg)	Sr	Bridgton Academy	Bronx, NY
G	30	Jamal White (W)	6 ft 4 in (1.93 m)	204 lb (93 kg)	So	Roosevelt/Long Island	Roosevelt, NY
G	31	Malik Stith	5 ft 11 in (1.8 m)	185 lb (84 kg)	So	Bridgton Academy	Hempstead, NY
F	32	Justin Brownlee	6 ft 7 in (2.01 m)	232 lb (105 kg)	Sr	Choctawhatchee/Chipola	Tifton, GA
G	35	Cameron Edison (W)	6 ft 1 in (1.85 m)	170 lb (77 kg)	Jr	Rolling Hills Prep	Carson, CA
G	42	Kevin Clark (W)	6 ft 2 in (1.88 m)	204 lb (93 kg)	Sr	Dunmore	Dunmore, PA
F	55	Rob Thomas	6 ft 6 in (1.98 m)	247 lb (112 kg)	RS Sr	South Kent	Harlem, NY

Head coach

- Steve Lavin (Chapman)

Assistant coach(es)

- Mike Dunlap
- Rico Hines
- Tony Chiles
- Gene Keady (special asst.)

Legend

- (C) Team captain
- (S) Suspended
- (I) Ineligible
- (W) Walk-on
- Injured
- Current redshirt

== Schedule and results ==
Date time, TV	Rank^{#}	Opponent^{#}	Result	Record	Site (attendance) city, state
Exhibition
November 6*; 7:00pm		Westmont	W 100–42	—	Carnesecca Arena; Queens, NY
Regular season
November 16*; 2:00am, ESPN		at Saint Mary's	L 71–76	0–1	McKeon Pavilion (3,500); Moraga, CA
November 17*; 8:00pm		Columbia	W 79–66	1–1	Carnesecca Arena (4,657); Queens, NY
November 25*; 1:45am, MSG Plus		vs. Ball State; Great Alaska Shootout quarterfinals	W 78–73 ^{OT}	2–1	Sullivan Arena (4,632); Anchorage, AK
November 26*; 9:30pm, MSG Plus		vs. Drake; Great Alaska Shootout semifinals	W 82–39	3–1	Sullivan Arena (4,976); Anchorage, AK
November 28*; 12:00am, MSG Plus		vs. Arizona State; Great Alaska Shootout finals	W 67–58	4–1	Sullivan Arena (5,662); Anchorage, AK
December 1*; 7:00pm		Wagner	W 69–61	5–1	Carnesecca Arena (4,008); Queens, NY
December 7*; 7:00pm, SNY		St. Bonaventure	L 66–67	5–2	Carnesecca Arena (4,408); Queens, NY
December 11*; 7:00pm, YES Network		at Fordham	L 81–84	5–3	Rose Hill Gym (3,200); Bronx, NY
December 20*; 9:30pm, MSG		Davidson; Madison Square Garden Holiday Festival	W 62–57	6–3	Madison Square Garden (6,596); New York, NY
December 21*; 9:30pm, MSG		Northwestern; Madison Square Garden Holiday Festival	W 85–69	7–3	Madison Square Garden (5,583); New York, NY
December 29; 7:00pm, SNY		at West Virginia	W 81–71	8–3 (1–0)	WVU Coliseum (11,138); Morgantown, WV
January 1; 7:00pm, SNY		at Providence	W 67–65	9–3 (2–0)	Dunkin' Donuts Center (8,157); Providence, RI
January 3; 7:00pm, ESPN2		No. 13 Georgetown	W 61–58	10–3 (3–0)	Madison Square Garden (8,897); New York, NY
January 8; 8:00pm, ESPNU		at No. 15 Notre Dame	L 61–76	10–4 (3–1)	Edmund P. Joyce Center (8,032); Notre Dame, IN
January 12; 7:00pm, ESPNU		No. 4 Syracuse	L 59–76	10–5 (3–2)	Madison Square Garden (14,440); New York, NY
January 16; 12:00pm, ESPNU		No. 11 Notre Dame	W 72–54	11–5 (4–2)	Madison Square Garden (8,550); New York, NY
January 19; 7:00pm, SNY		at No. 15 Louisville	L 63–88	11–6 (4–3)	KFC Yum! Center (21,638); Louisville, KY
January 22; 4:00pm, SNY		Cincinnati	L 51–53	11–7 (4–4)	Carnesecca Arena (5,602); Queens, NY
January 26; 7:00pm, SNY		at No. 20 Georgetown	L 52–77	11–8 (4–5)	Verizon Center (7,160); Washington, D.C.
January 30*; 1:00pm, CBS		No. 3 Duke	W 93–78	12–8	Madison Square Garden (19,353); New York, NY
February 2; 9:00pm, SNY		Rutgers	W 58–56	13–8 (5–5)	Carnesecca Arena (5,002); Queens, NY
February 5*; 1:00pm, CBS		at UCLA	L 59–66	13–9	Pauley Pavilion (8,592); Los Angeles, CA
February 10; 7:00pm, ESPN		No. 9 Connecticut	W 89–72	14–9 (6–5)	Madison Square Garden (13,652); New York, NY
February 13; 2:00pm, MSG		at Cincinnati	W 59–57	15–9 (7–5)	Fifth Third Arena (7,374); Cincinnati, OH
February 15; 9:00pm, ESPNU		at Marquette	W 80–68	16–9 (8–5)	Bradley Center (17,270); Milwaukee, WI
February 19; 12:00pm, ESPN		No. 4 Pittsburgh	W 60–59	17–9 (9–5)	Madison Square Garden (14,514); New York, NY
February 23; 7:00pm, MSG Plus	No. 23	DePaul	W 76–51	18–9 (10–5)	Carnesecca Arena (5,602); Queens, NY
February 26; 2:00pm, ESPN	No. 23	at No. 15 Villanova	W 81–68	19–9 (11–5)	Wells Fargo Center (16,042); Philadelphia, PA
March 3; 7:00pm, ESPN2	No. 15	at Seton Hall	L 70–84	19–10 (11–6)	Prudential Center (9,470); Newark, NJ
March 5; 8:00pm, MSG	No. 15	South Florida	W 72–56	20–10 (12–6)	Carnesecca Arena (5,602); Queens, NY
Big East tournament
March 9; 2:00pm, ESPN	(5) No. 17	(13) Rutgers; Second Round	W 65–63	21–10	Madison Square Garden (19,375); New York, NY
March 10; 2:00pm, ESPN	(5) No. 17	(4) No. 13 Syracuse; Quarterfinals	L 73–79	21–11	Madison Square Garden (19,375); New York, NY
NCAA tournament
March 17*; 9:45pm, CBS	(6 SE) No. 18	vs. (11 SE) Gonzaga; First Round	L 71–86	21–12	Pepsi Center (19,216); Denver, CO
*Non-conference game. ^{#}Rankings from AP Poll. (#) Tournament seedings in parentheses. SE=NCAA Southeast Regional.
