= 2010–11 Cincinnati Bearcats men's basketball team =

American college basketball season

2010–11 Cincinnati Bearcats men's basketball

NCAA Tournament, Round of 32
- Conference: Big East Conference
- Record: 26–9 (11–7 Big East)
- Head coach: Mick Cronin (5th season)
- Assistant coaches: Larry Davis (5th season); George Jackson (2nd season); Darren Savino (1st season)
- Home arena: Fifth Third Arena

2010–11 Big East men's basketball standings
	Conf.				Overall
Team	W		L	PCT	W		L	PCT
No. 4 Pittsburgh	15	–	3	.833	28	–	6	.824
No. 5 Notre Dame	14	–	4	.778	27	–	7	.794
*No. 12 Syracuse	12	–	6	.667	27	–	8	.771
No. 14 Louisville	12	–	6	.667	25	–	10	.714
No. 18 St. John's	12	–	6	.667	21	–	12	.636
Cincinnati	11	–	7	.611	26	–	9	.743
No. 22 West Virginia	11	–	7	.611	21	–	12	.636
Georgetown	10	–	8	.556	21	–	11	.656
No. 9 Connecticut†	9	–	9	.500	32	–	9	.780
Villanova	9	–	9	.500	21	–	12	.636
Marquette	9	–	9	.500	22	–	15	.595
Seton Hall	7	–	11	.389	13	–	18	.419
Rutgers	5	–	13	.278	15	–	17	.469
Providence	4	–	14	.222	15	–	17	.469
South Florida	3	–	15	.167	10	–	23	.303
DePaul	1	–	17	.056	7	–	24	.226
† 2011 Big East tournament winner As of April 4, 2011; *Syracuse:: 7 wins vacated due to sanctions against the program; Disputed record: Syracuse–(27–8)(10–6); Rankings from AP Poll

The 2010–11 Cincinnati Bearcats men's basketball team represented the University of Cincinnati during the 2010–11 NCAA Division I men's basketball season. The team plays its home games in Cincinnati at the Fifth Third Arena, which has a capacity of 13,176. They are members of the Big East Conference. They were invited to the NCAA Tournament who they defeated Missouri in the first round before falling to the NCAA Champions UConn in the second round.

== Offseason ==
=== Departing players ===
Name	Number	Pos.	Height	Weight	Year	Hometown	Notes
Deonta Vaughn	5	G	6'1"	190	Senior	Indianapolis, Indiana	Graduated
Steve Toyloy	25	C	6'8"	255	Senior	West Palm Beach, Florida	Graduated
Lance Stephenson	33	G	6'5"	210	Freshman	Brooklyn, New York	Declared for the NBA draft; Selected 40th overall by the Indiana Pacers

=== Recruiting class of 2010 ===
College recruiting information
Name	Hometown	School	Height	Weight	Commit date
Justin Jackson; F	Cocoa Beach, Florida	Arlington Country Day School	6 ft 8 in (2.03 m)	220 lb (100 kg)	Aug 27, 2009
Justin Jackson; F	Recruit ratings: Rivals: 247Sports: (94)				
Kelvin Gaines; F	Ocala, Florida	Arlington Country Day School	6 ft 10 in (2.08 m)	225 lb (102 kg)	Nov 17, 2009
Kelvin Gaines; F	Recruit ratings: Rivals: 247Sports: (90)				
Overall recruit ranking: 247Sports: 86
Note: In many cases, Scout, Rivals, 247Sports, On3, and ESPN may conflict in their listings of height and weight.; In these cases, the average was taken. ESPN grades are on a 100-point scale.; Sources: "Cincinnati 2010 Player Commits". ESPN.; "2010 Team Ranking". Rivals.

=== Recruiting class of 2011 ===
College recruiting information (2011)
Name	Hometown	School	Height	Weight	Commit date
Ge'Lawn Guyn; SG	Lexington, KY	South Kent Prep	6 ft 3 in (1.91 m)	180 lb (82 kg)	Jul 1, 2010
Ge'Lawn Guyn; SG	Recruit ratings: Scout: Rivals: 247Sports: (91)				
Shaq Thomas; SF	Paterson, NJ	NIA Prep	6 ft 7 in (2.01 m)	180 lb (82 kg)	Sep 10, 2010
Shaq Thomas; SF	Recruit ratings: Scout: Rivals: 247Sports: (92)				
Jermaine Sanders; SF	New York, NY	Rice High School	6 ft 4 in (1.93 m)	205 lb (93 kg)	Sep 27, 2010
Jermaine Sanders; SF	Recruit ratings: Scout: Rivals: 247Sports: (91)				
Jeremiah Davis; SG	Muncie, IN	Huntington Prep	6 ft 2 in (1.88 m)	200 lb (91 kg)	Nov 13, 2010
Jeremiah Davis; SG	Recruit ratings: Scout: Rivals: 247Sports: (90)				
Octavius Ellis; PF	Memphis, TN	Whitehaven High School	6 ft 8 in (2.03 m)	185 lb (84 kg)	
Octavius Ellis; PF	Recruit ratings: Scout: Rivals: 247Sports: (89)				
Overall recruit ranking: 247Sports: 26
Note: In many cases, Scout, Rivals, 247Sports, On3, and ESPN may conflict in their listings of height and weight.; In these cases, the average was taken. ESPN grades are on a 100-point scale.; Sources: "Cincinnati 2011 Player Commits". ESPN.; "2011 Team Ranking". Rivals.

== Roster ==
2010–11 Cincinnati Bearcats men's basketball team
Players
Coaches

Pos.	#	Name	Height	Weight	Year	Previous school	Hometown
G	1	Cashmere Wright	6 ft 0 in (1.83 m)	175 lb (79 kg)	RS So	Urban Christian Academy	Savannah, Georgia
G	2	Eddie Tyree (W,C)	5 ft 10 in (1.78 m)	180 lb (82 kg)	Sr	Thomas More	Columbus, Ohio
G	3	Dion Dixon	6 ft 3 in (1.91 m)	195 lb (88 kg)	Jr	Crane High School	Chicago, Illinois
F	5	Justin Jackson	6 ft 8 in (2.03 m)	210 lb (95 kg)	Fr	Arlington Country Day School	Cocoa Beach, Florida
G	10	Alex Eppensteiner (W)	6 ft 3 in (1.91 m)	210 lb (95 kg)	So	Elder High School	Cincinnati, Ohio
G	11	Larry Davis (C)	6 ft 3 in (1.91 m)	185 lb (84 kg)	Sr	Alief Hastings High School	Houston, Texas
F	15	Darnell Wilks (C)	6 ft 7 in (2.01 m)	205 lb (93 kg)	Sr	Pioneer Christian Academy	Nashville, Tennessee
F	22	Rashad Bishop (C)	6 ft 6 in (1.98 m)	220 lb (100 kg)	Sr	Kennedy High School	Paterson, New Jersey
G/F	23	Sean Kilpatrick	6 ft 4 in (1.93 m)	215 lb (98 kg)	RS Fr	Notre Dame Prep	White Plains, New York
F	24	Kelvin Gaines (redshirt)	6 ft 10 in (2.08 m)	225 lb (102 kg)	Fr	Arlington Country Day School	Ocala, Florida
G	25	Anthony McBride (W)	6 ft 2 in (1.88 m)	180 lb (82 kg)	RS Fr	Withrow High School	Cincinnati, Ohio
C	30	Anthony McClain	7 ft 0 in (2.13 m)	290 lb (132 kg)	Sr	National Christian Academy	Trenton, New Jersey
F	32	Ibrahima Thomas (C)	6 ft 11 in (2.11 m)	235 lb (107 kg)	Sr	Oklahoma State	Dakar, Senegal
F	34	Yancy Gates	6 ft 9 in (2.06 m)	260 lb (118 kg)	Jr	Withrow High School	Cincinnati, Ohio
F	44	JaQuon Parker	6 ft 3 in (1.91 m)	210 lb (95 kg)	So	King's Fork High School	Suffolk, Virginia

Head coach

- Mick Cronin (Cincinnati)

Assistant coach(es)

- Larry Davis (Asbury)
- George Jackson (Wittenberg)
- Darren Savino (NJCU)

Legend

- (C) Team captain
- (S) Suspended
- (I) Ineligible
- (W) Walk-on
- Injured
- Current redshirt

Roster
Last update: 2 Sep 2020

=== Depth chart ===
Pos.	Starting 5	Bench 1	Bench 2
C	Ibrahima Thomas	Justin Jackson	Anthony McClain
PF	Yancy Gates	Darnell Wilks
SF	Rashad Bishop	JaQuon Parker	Alex Eppensteiner
SG	Dion Dixon	Sean Kilpatrick	Anthony McBride
PG	Cashmere Wright	Larry Davis	Eddie Tyree

== Schedule ==
Date time, TV	Rank^{#}	Opponent^{#}	Result	Record	Site (attendance) city, state
Exhibition
November 1, 2010*; 7:00pm		Carleton	W 89–57		Fifth Third Arena (3,426); Cincinnati, OH
November 9, 2010*; 7:00pm		Indiana-Southeast	W 91–63		Fifth Third Arena (3,714); Cincinnati, OH
Regular Season
November 15, 2010*; 7:00pm, FS Ohio/Big East Network		Mount St. Mary's	W 69–59	1–0	Fifth Third Arena (4,083); Cincinnati, OH
November 20, 2010*; 1:00pm, FS Ohio/Big East Network		IPFW	W 65–59	2–0	Fifth Third Arena (4,491); Cincinnati, OH
November 22, 2010*; 7:00pm		Florida A&M	W 76–51	3–0	Fifth Third Arena (4,116); Cincinnati, OH
November 24, 2010*; 7:00pm, FS Ohio/Big East Network		Savannah State	W 54–41	4–0	Fifth Third Arena (3,949); Cincinnati, OH
November 27, 2010*; 7:00pm		vs. Dayton	W 68–34	5–0	US Bank Arena (6,016); Cincinnati, OH
December 1, 2010*; 7:00pm		Wright State	W 77–69	6–0	Fifth Third Arena (5,871); Cincinnati, OH
December 4, 2010*; 7:00pm		at Toledo	W 81–47	7–0	Savage Hall (5,332); Toledo, OH
December 11, 2010*; 8:00pm, FS Ohio/Big East Network		Utah Valley	W 92–72	8–0	Fifth Third Arena (5,054); Cincinnati, OH
December 14, 2010*; 7:00pm, FS Ohio/Big East Network		Georgia Southern	W 99–54	9–0	Fifth Third Arena (4,523); Cincinnati, OH
December 18, 2010*; 9:00pm, ESPNU		vs. Oklahoma; All-College Basketball Classic	W 66–56	10–0	Ford Center (10,625); Oklahoma City, OK
December 21, 2010*; 7:00pm, ESPN3		at Miami (OH)	W 64–48	11–0	Millett Hall (3,297); Oxford, OH
December 23, 2010*; 7:00pm, FS Ohio/Big East Network		Saint Francis (PA)	W 94–58	12–0	Fifth Third Arena (5,504); Cincinnati, OH
December 28, 2010; 7:00pm, ESPNU		DePaul	W 76–60	13–0 (1–0)	Fifth Third Arena (5,651); Cincinnati, OH
December 31, 2010; 8:00pm, ESPN2		Seton Hall	W 70–53	14–0 (2–0)	Fifth Third Arena (5,530); Cincinnati, OH
January 6, 2011*; 7:00pm, ESPN2	No. 24	Xavier; Crosstown Shootout	W 66–46	15–0	Fifth Third Arena (13,176); Cincinnati, OH
January 9, 2011; 12:00pm, FS Ohio/Big East Network	No. 24	at No. 7 Villanova	L 61–72	15–1 (2–1)	The Pavilion (6,500); Villanova, PA
January 12, 2011; 7:00pm, FS Ohio/Big East Network	No. 25	South Florida	W 74–66	16–1 (3–1)	Fifth Third Arena (6,201); Cincinnati, OH
January 15, 2011; 12:00pm, Big East Network	No. 25	at No. 4 Syracuse	L 52–67	16–2 (3–2)	Carrier Dome (24,338); Syracuse, NY
January 19, 2011; 7:00pm, ESPN2	No. 25	at No. 16 Notre Dame	L 58–66	16–3 (3–3)	Edmund P. Joyce Center (8,309); Notre Dame, IN
January 22, 2011; 4:00pm, FS Ohio/Big East Network	No. 25	at St. John's	W 53–51	17–3 (4–3)	Carnesecca Arena (5,602); Queens, NY
January 26, 2011; 9:00pm, FS Ohio/Big East Network		Rutgers	W 72–56	18–3 (5–3)	Fifth Third Arena (6,404); Cincinnati, OH
January 29, 2011; 8:00pm, FS Ohio/Big East Network		West Virginia	L 55–66	18–4 (5–4)	Fifth Third Arena (13,176); Cincinnati, OH
February 5, 2011; 6:00pm, FS Ohio/Big East Network		at No. 4 Pittsburgh	L 59–71	18–5 (5–5)	Peterson Events Center (12,615); Pittsburgh, PA
February 8, 2011; 7:00pm, ESPN2		at DePaul	W 71–68	19–5 (6–5)	Allstate Arena (7,643); Rosemont, IL
February 13, 2011; 12:00pm, FS Ohio/Big East Network		St. John's	L 57–59	19–6 (6–6)	Fifth Third Arena (7,374); Cincinnati, OH
February 16, 2011; 7:00pm, ESPN2		No. 16 Louisville; Rivalry	W 63–54	20–6 (7–6)	Fifth Third Arena (11,511); Cincinnati, OH
February 19, 2011; 7:00pm, ESPNU		at Providence	W 93–81 ^{OT}	21–6 (8–6)	Dunkin' Donuts Center (9,432); Providence, RI
February 23, 2011; 9:00pm, FS Ohio/Big East Network		at No. 11 Georgetown	W 58–46	22–6 (9–6)	Verizon Center (13,241); Washington, D.C.
February 27, 2011; 12:00pm, ESPNU		No. 14 Connecticut	L 59–67	22–7 (9–7)	Fifth Third Arena (11,246); Cincinnati, OH
March 2, 2011; 8:00pm, ESPN3		at Marquette	W 67–60	23–7 (10–7)	Bradley Center (15,538); Milwaukee, WI
March 5, 2011; 2:00pm, Big East Network		No. 17 Georgetown	W 69–47	24–7 (11–7)	Fifth Third Arena (12,197); Cincinnati, OH
Big East tournament
March 9, 2011; 7:00pm, ESPN	(7) No. 25	vs. (15) South Florida; Second Round	W 87–61	25–7	Madison Square Garden (19,375); New York, NY
March 10, 2011; 7:00pm, ESPN	(7) No. 25	vs. (2) No. 4 Notre Dame; Quarterfinals	L 51–89	25–8	Madison Square Garden (19,375); New York, NY
NCAA Tournament
March 17, 2011*; 9:50pm, TNT	(6 W)	vs. (11 W) Missouri; Second Round	W 78–63	26–8	Verizon Center (17,706); Washington, D.C.
March 19, 2011*; 9:40pm, TBS	(6 W)	vs. (3 W) No. 9 Connecticut; Third Round	L 58–69	26–9	Verizon Center (18,684); Washington, D.C.
*Non-conference game. ^{#}Rankings from AP Poll. (#) Tournament seedings in parentheses. W=NCAA West region.

== Awards and milestones ==
=== Big East Conference honors ===
==== All-Big East Rookie Team ====
- Sean Kilpatrick

==== Rookie of the Week ====
- Week 1: Sean Kilpatrick
- Week 13: Sean Kilpatrick

== Rankings ==
Ranking Movement	Week																			
Poll	Pre	1	2	3	4	5	6	7	8	9	10	11	12	13	14	15	16	17	18	Final
USA Today/ESPN Coaches				RV		RV	RV	RV	25	RV	RV	RV								
Associated Press				RV	RV	RV	RV	RV	24	25	25	RV	RV	RV						

^{1 – Note that rankings above 25 are not official rankings. They are representations of ranking based on the number of points received in the weekly poll.}
