= 2010–11 Syracuse Orange men's basketball team =

American college basketball season

2010–11 Syracuse Orange men's basketball

Legends Classic Champions

NCAA Tournament, Round of 32
- Conference: Big East Conference

Ranking
- Coaches: No. 18
- AP: No. 12
- Record: 27–8, 7 wins vacated (12–6 Big East)
- Head coach: Jim Boeheim
- Assistant coaches: Bernie Fine; Mike Hopkins; Rob Murphy
- Home arena: Carrier Dome

2010–11 Big East men's basketball standings
	Conf.				Overall
Team	W		L	PCT	W		L	PCT
No. 4 Pittsburgh	15	–	3	.833	28	–	6	.824
No. 5 Notre Dame	14	–	4	.778	27	–	7	.794
*No. 12 Syracuse	12	–	6	.667	27	–	8	.771
No. 14 Louisville	12	–	6	.667	25	–	10	.714
No. 18 St. John's	12	–	6	.667	21	–	12	.636
Cincinnati	11	–	7	.611	26	–	9	.743
No. 22 West Virginia	11	–	7	.611	21	–	12	.636
Georgetown	10	–	8	.556	21	–	11	.656
No. 9 Connecticut†	9	–	9	.500	32	–	9	.780
Villanova	9	–	9	.500	21	–	12	.636
Marquette	9	–	9	.500	22	–	15	.595
Seton Hall	7	–	11	.389	13	–	18	.419
Rutgers	5	–	13	.278	15	–	17	.469
Providence	4	–	14	.222	15	–	17	.469
South Florida	3	–	15	.167	10	–	23	.303
DePaul	1	–	17	.056	7	–	24	.226
† 2011 Big East tournament winner As of April 4, 2011; *Syracuse:: 7 wins vacated due to sanctions against the program; Disputed record: Syracuse–(27–8)(10–6); Rankings from AP Poll

The 2010–11 Syracuse Orange men's basketball team represented Syracuse University in the 2010–11 NCAA Division I men's basketball season. The head coach was Jim Boeheim, serving for his 35th year. The team played its home games at the Carrier Dome in Syracuse, New York and were members of the Big East Conference. They finished the season 27–8, 12–6 in Big East play, and lost in the semifinals of the 2011 Big East men's basketball tournament to Connecticut. They received an at-large bid to the 2011 NCAA Division I men's basketball tournament, where they beat Indiana State in the second round before being upset in the third round by Marquette.

Due to NCAA sanctions, seven wins were vacated.

== Preseason ==
=== Roster changes ===
Syracuse graduated two starters from the previous year's team, shooting guard Andy Rautins and center Arinze Onuaku. In addition, junior forward Wes Johnson declared that he would enter the 2010 NBA draft. He was selected fourth overall by the Minnesota Timberwolves.

=== Recruiting ===
College recruiting
Name	Hometown	School	Height	Weight	Commit date
Fabricio de Melo; C	Rio de Janeiro, Brazil	The Sagemont School	7 ft 0 in (2.13 m)	270 lb (120 kg)	Aug 3, 2009
Fabricio de Melo; C	Recruit ratings: Scout: Rivals: (96)				
C. J. Fair; SF	Baltimore, Maryland	Brewster Academy	6 ft 7 in (2.01 m)	200 lb (91 kg)	Oct 19, 2008
C. J. Fair; SF	Recruit ratings: Scout: Rivals: (94)				
Baye Moussa Keita; C	Saint-Louis, Senegal	Oak Hill Academy	6 ft 11 in (2.11 m)	220 lb (100 kg)	Oct 21, 2008
Baye Moussa Keita; C	Recruit ratings: Scout: Rivals: (91)				
Dion Waiters; SG	Philadelphia, Pennsylvania	Life Center Academy	6 ft 4 in (1.93 m)	210 lb (95 kg)	Jul 11, 2007
Dion Waiters; SG	Recruit ratings: Scout: Rivals: (96)				
Overall recruit ranking: Scout: #7 Rivals: #7 ESPN: #5
Note: In many cases, Scout, Rivals, 247Sports, On3, and ESPN may conflict in their listings of height and weight.; In these cases, the average was taken. ESPN grades are on a 100-point scale.; Sources: "2010 Syracuse Signees". Rivals.; "2010 Syracuse Signees". Scout.; "2010 Syracuse Signees". ESPN.; "Scout.com Team Recruiting Rankings". Scout.; "2010 Team Ranking". Rivals.

=== Preseason outlook ===
In the USA TODAY/ESPN coaches preseason poll, Syracuse ranked #13 in the country.

In the AP preseason poll, writers voted Syracuse #10 in the country.

In the Big East preseason Coaches' Poll, Syracuse was predicted to finish third. The Orange received two first place votes. Fabricio de Melo was named Preseason Rookie of the Year. Kris Joseph was named to the All-Big East second team, and Rick Jackson received an honorable mention.

A preseason poll of writers in Big East cities conducted by the Syracuse Post-Standard predicted the Orange would finish third. Two writers predicted Syracuse would finish first. Kris Joseph was named to the pre-season All-Big East first team and received some preseason Player of the Year votes. Fabricio de Melo won the Rookie of the Year with nine votes, while Dion Waiters received two votes.

== Roster ==
2010–11 Syracuse Orange men's basketball team
Players
Coaches

Pos.	#	Name	Height	Weight	Year	Previous school	Hometown
F	00	Rick Jackson	6 ft 9 in (2.06 m)	240 lb (109 kg)	Sr	Neumann-Goretti	Philadelphia, Pennsylvania
G	2	Nick Resavy	6 ft 2 in (1.88 m)	201 lb (91 kg)	Jr	West Milford	West Milford, New Jersey
G	3	Dion Waiters	6 ft 4 in (1.93 m)	215 lb (98 kg)	Fr	Life Center Academy	Philadelphia, Pennsylvania
G	4	Nolan Hart	5 ft 10 in (1.78 m)	152 lb (69 kg)	Fr	Albany Academy	Albany, New York
F	5	C. J. Fair	6 ft 8 in (2.03 m)	203 lb (92 kg)	Fr	Brewster Academy	Baltimore, Maryland
G	11	Scoop Jardine	6 ft 2 in (1.88 m)	190 lb (86 kg)	Jr	Neumann-Goretti	Philadelphia, Pennsylvania
C	12	Baye Moussa Keita	6 ft 10 in (2.08 m)	213 lb (97 kg)	Fr	Oak Hill Academy	Saint Louis, Senegal
G	13	Griffin Hoffmann	6 ft 0 in (1.83 m)	178 lb (81 kg)	So	York Preparatory	New York, New York
F	14	Matt Lyde-Cajuste	6 ft 4 in (1.93 m)	205 lb (93 kg)	So	Iona Preparatory	Mt. Vernon, New York
G	20	Brandon Triche	6 ft 4 in (1.93 m)	205 lb (93 kg)	So	Jamesville-DeWitt	Jamesville, New York
F	21	Mookie Jones	6 ft 6 in (1.98 m)	220 lb (100 kg)	So	Peekskill	Peekskill, New York
G	24	Brandon Reese	5 ft 11 in (1.8 m)	160 lb (73 kg)	Jr	Pine Crest	Davie, Florida
G	25	Russ DeRemer	6 ft 4 in (1.93 m)	210 lb (95 kg)	Fr	Xaverian Brothers	Wrentham, Massachusetts
F	32	Kris Joseph	6 ft 7 in (2.01 m)	210 lb (95 kg)	Jr	Archbishop Carroll (D.C.)	Montreal, Quebec
C	33	DaShonte Riley (injured)	7 ft 0 in (2.13 m)	233 lb (106 kg)	So	Detroit Country Day	Detroit, Michigan
F	34	Matt Tomaszewski	6 ft 8 in (2.03 m)	215 lb (98 kg)	Jr	Holderness	Seabrook, New Hampshire
F	43	James Southerland	6 ft 8 in (2.03 m)	210 lb (95 kg)	So	Notre Dame Preparatory (Massachusetts)	Bayside, New York
C	51	Fab Melo	7 ft 0 in (2.13 m)	244 lb (111 kg)	Fr	The Sagemont School	Rio de Janeiro, Brazil

Head coach

- Jim Boeheim, 35th yr. (Syracuse, 1966)

Assistant coach(es)

- Mike Hopkins, 15th yr. (Syracuse, 1993)
- Rob Murphy, 7th yr. (Central State, 1996)
- Gerry McNamara, 2nd yr. (Syracuse, 2007)

Strength and conditioning coach(es)

- Lazarus Sims, 4th yr. (Syracuse, 1996)

Legend

- (C) Team captain
- (S) Suspended
- (I) Ineligible
- (W) Walk-on
- Injured
- Current redshirt

Roster
Last update: September 28, 2010

=== Depth chart ===
Pos.	Starting 5	Bench
C	Fab Melo	Baye Keita
PF	Rick Jackson	James Southerland
SF	Kris Joseph	C.J. Fair
SG	Brandon Triche
PG	Scoop Jardine	Dion Waiters

== Season ==
Syracuse went 26-7 on the year and lost to Connecticut 76-71 (OT) in the semifinals of the Big East Conference tournament. They earned a #3 seed in the NCAA tournament and would face Indiana State in the second round.

== Schedule ==
Date time, TV	Rank^{#}	Opponent^{#}	Result	Record	High points	High rebounds	High assists	Site (attendance) city, state
Exhibition
November 2*; 7:00 pm, Time Warner Cable SportsNet	No. 10	Kutztown	W 96–60	—	14 – 2 tied	11 – Southerland	7 – Triche	Carrier Dome (7,371); Syracuse, New York
November 9*; 7:00 pm, Time Warner Cable SportsNet	No. 10	Le Moyne	W 91–48	—	13 – 3 tied	9 – Jackson	5 – 2 tied	Carrier Dome (10,546); Syracuse, New York
Regular season
November 12*; 7:00 pm, ESPN3	No. 10	Northern Iowa	W 68–46	1–0	14 – 2 tied	7 – Jackson	5 – Triche	Carrier Dome (22,198); Syracuse, New York
November 14*; 3:00 pm, ESPNU	No. 10	Canisius	W 86–67	2–0	17 – Jackson	15 – Keita	7 – Triche	Carrier Dome (20,454); Syracuse, New York
November 16*; 7:00 pm, ESPN3	No. 10	Detroit; Legends Classic	W 66–55	3–0	27 – Jardine	22 – Jackson	8 – Jardine	Carrier Dome (17,379); Syracuse, New York
November 21*; 2:00 pm, Time Warner Cable SportsNet	No. 10	William & Mary; Legends Classic	W 63–60	4–0	18 – Joseph	10 – Jackson	9 – Jardine	Carrier Dome (17,933); Syracuse, New York
November 26*; 8:00 pm, HDNet	No. 9	vs. Michigan; Legends Classic	W 53–50	5–0	22 – Joseph	12 – Jackson	5 – Jardine	Boardwalk Hall (6,273); Atlantic City, New Jersey
November 27*; 8:00 pm, HDNet	No. 9	vs. Georgia Tech; Legends Classic	W 80–76	6–0	19 – Joseph	14 – Jackson	8 – Jardine	Boardwalk Hall (5,271); Atlantic City, New Jersey
November 30*; 7:00 pm, Time Warner Cable SportsNet	No. 8	Cornell	W 78–58	7–0	17 – Jackson	13 – Jackson	7 – Jardine	Carrier Dome (20,548); Syracuse, New York
December 4*; 5:15 pm, ESPN2	No. 8	NC State	W 65–59	8–0	23 – Jardine	11 – Jackson	6 – Jardine	Carrier Dome (22,334); Syracuse, New York
December 7*; 9:30 pm, ESPN	No. 8	vs. No. 7 Michigan State; Jimmy V Classic	W 72–58	9–0	19 – Jardine	22 – Jackson	4 – Triche	Madison Square Garden (19,391); New York, New York
December 11*; 7:00 pm, Time Warner Cable SportsNet	No. 8	Colgate	W 100–43	10–0	18 – Jackson	10 – Jackson	5 – Waiters	Carrier Dome (21,247); Syracuse, New York
December 18*; 7:00 pm, Time Warner Cable SportsNet	No. 5	Iona	W 83–77	11–0	21 – Joseph	8 – Jackson	7 – Triche	Carrier Dome (17,871); Syracuse, New York
December 20*; 7:00 pm, Time Warner Cable SportsNet	No. 5	Morgan State	W 97–55	12–0	18 – 2 tied	9 – Jackson	8 – Waiters	Carrier Dome (16,031); Syracuse, New York
December 22*; 7:00 pm, Time Warner Cable SportsNet	No. 5	Drexel	W 93–65	13–0	25 – Joseph	12 – Jackson	5 – 2 tied	Carrier Dome (17,856); Syracuse, New York
Big East regular season
December 28; 9:00 pm, ESPNU	No. 5	Providence	W 81–74	14–0 (1–0)	27 – Joseph	18 – Jackson	7 – Jardine	Carrier Dome (20,388); Syracuse, New York
January 1; 3:30 pm, ESPNU	No. 5	No. 15 Notre Dame	W 70–58	15–0 (2–0)	18 – Joseph	8 – Joseph	9 – Jardine	Carrier Dome (23,058); Syracuse, New York
January 8; 12:00 pm, Big East Network	No. 4	at Seton Hall	W 61–56	16–0 (3–0)	15 – 2 tied	17 – Jackson	4 – Jackson	Prudential Center (10,862); Newark, New Jersey
January 12; 7:00 pm, ESPNU	No. 4	at St. John's	W 76–59	17–0 (4–0)	18 – Joseph	11 – Jackson	4 – 2 tied	Madison Square Garden (14,440); New York, New York
January 15; 12:00 pm, Big East Network	No. 4	No. 25 Cincinnati	W 67–52	18–0 (5–0)	15 – Jackson	11 – Jackson	7 – Jardine	Carrier Dome (24,338); Syracuse, New York
January 17; 7:30 pm, ESPN	No. 3	at No. 5 Pittsburgh	L 66–74	18–1 (5–1)	16 – Fair	11 – Jackson	4 – Jardine, Southerland	Petersen Events Center (12,925); Pittsburgh, Pennsylvania
January 22; 12:00 pm, ESPN	No. 3	No. 7 Villanova	L 72–83	18–2 (5–2)	23 – Joseph	5 – Jackson	4 – Triche	Carrier Dome (33,736); Syracuse, New York
January 25; 7:00 pm, Big East Network	No. 9	Seton Hall	L 68–90	18–3 (5–3)	17 – Joseph	19 – Jackson	3 – 3 tied	Carrier Dome (21,950); Syracuse, New York
January 29; 3:00 pm, ESPNU	No. 9	at Marquette	L 70–76	18–4 (5–4)	18 – Joseph	7 – Keita	13 – Jardine	Bradley Center (19,032); Milwaukee, Wisconsin
February 2; 7:00 pm, ESPN	No. 17	at No. 6 Connecticut; Rivalry	W 66–58	19–4 (6–4)	13 – Jackson	13 – Jackson	6 – Jardine	XL Center (16,294); Hartford, Connecticut
February 5; 2:00 pm, Big East Network	No. 17	at South Florida	W 72–49	20–4 (7–4)	21 – Jackson	12 – Jackson	8 – Jardine	St. Pete Times Forum (10,051); Tampa, Florida
February 9; 7:00 pm, ESPN	No. 12	No. 11 Georgetown; Rivalry	L 56–64	20–5 (7–5)	14 – Joseph	8 – Jackson	6 – Jardine	Carrier Dome (26,904); Syracuse, New York
February 12; 12:00 pm, ESPN	No. 12	at No. 16 Louisville	L 69–73	20–6 (7–6)	21 – Triche	7 – 3 tied	4 – Jardine	KFC Yum! Center (22,755); Louisville, Kentucky
February 14; 7:00 pm, ESPN	No. 20	West Virginia	W 63–52	21–6 (8–6)	20 – Triche	9 – Jackson	6 – Jardine	Carrier Dome (22,669); Syracuse, New York
February 19; 7:00 pm, Big East Network	No. 20	Rutgers	W 84–80 ^{OT}	22–6 (9–6)	21 – Joseph	12 – Jackson	4 – 3 tied	Carrier Dome (28,944); Syracuse, New York
February 21; 7:00 pm, ESPN	No. 17	at No. 15 Villanova	W 69–64	23–6 (10–6)	20 – Jardine	8 – Joseph	6 – Jardine	Wells Fargo Center (18,899); Philadelphia, Pennsylvania
February 26; 12:00 pm, CBS	No. 17	at No. 11 Georgetown; Rivalry	W 58–51	24–6 (11–6)	17 – Jardine	7 – Jackson	7 – Jardine	Verizon Center (20,276); Washington, D.C.
March 5; 4:00 pm, Big East Network	No. 12	DePaul	W 107–59	25–6 (12–6)	14 – 2 tied	7 – 2 tied	8 – Jardine	Carrier Dome (28,086); Syracuse, New York
Big East tournament
March 10*; 2:00 pm, ESPN	(4) No. 11	vs. (5) No. 17 St. John's; Big East Quarterfinals	W 79–73	26–6	22 – Triche	9 – Jackson	5 – Triche	Madison Square Garden (19,375); New York, New York
March 11*; 7:00 pm, ESPN	(4) No. 11	vs. (9) No. 21 Connecticut; Big East Semifinals/Rivalry	L 71–76 ^{OT}	26–7	20 – 2 tied	9 – Joseph	5 – Triche	Madison Square Garden (19,375); New York, New York
NCAA tournament
March 18*; 9:57 pm, truTV	(3 E) No. 12	vs. (14 E) Indiana State; NCAA Second Round	W 77–60	27–7	23 – Jackson	10 – Joseph	9 – Jardine	Quicken Loans Arena (20,164); Cleveland, Ohio
March 20*; 7:45 pm, truTV	(3 E) No. 12	vs. (11 E) Marquette; NCAA Third Round	L 62–66	27–8	18 – Waiters	9 – Joseph	6 – Jardine	Quicken Loans Arena (20,164); Cleveland, Ohio
*Non-conference game. ^{#}Rankings from AP poll. (#) Tournament seedings in parentheses. E=NCAA East Regional. All times are in Eastern Time.

== Rankings ==
Ranking movement Legend: ██ Improvement in ranking. ██ Decrease in ranking. ██ Not ranked the previous week. RV=Others receiving votes.
Poll	Pre	Wk 1	Wk 2	Wk 3	Wk 4	Wk 5	Wk 6	Wk 7	Wk 8	Wk 9	Wk 10	Wk 11	Wk 12	Wk 13	Wk 14	Wk 15	Wk 16	WK 17	Wk 18	Final
AP	10	10	9	8	8	5	5	5	4	4	3	9	17	12	17	17	12	11		
Coaches	13	11	10	7	7	5	5	5	4	4	3	10	17	13	20	20	12	11		
ESPN Power Ranking	NA	8	NA	NA	9	5	4	4	4	4	3	5	17	14	17	20	15	14		

== 2011 signing class ==
College recruiting
Name	Hometown	School	Height	Weight	Commit date
Michael Carter-Williams; PG	Hamilton, Massachusetts	St. Andrew's School	6 ft 4 in (1.93 m)	175 lb (79 kg)	Nov 1, 2009
Michael Carter-Williams; PG	Recruit ratings: Scout: Rivals: (97)				
Rakeem Christmas; C	Philadelphia, Pennsylvania	Academy of the New Church	6 ft 9 in (2.06 m)	230 lb (100 kg)	Aug 6, 2010
Rakeem Christmas; C	Recruit ratings: Scout: Rivals: (97)				
Trevor Cooney; SG	Wilmington, Delaware	Sanford School	6 ft 3 in (1.91 m)	180 lb (82 kg)	Feb 26, 2010
Trevor Cooney; SG	Recruit ratings: Scout: Rivals: (94)				
Overall recruit ranking: ESPN: #10
Note: In many cases, Scout, Rivals, 247Sports, On3, and ESPN may conflict in their listings of height and weight.; In these cases, the average was taken. ESPN grades are on a 100-point scale.; Sources: "2011 Syracuse Signees". Rivals.; "2011 Syracuse Signees". Scout.; "2011 Syracuse Signees". ESPN.; "Scout.com Team Recruiting Rankings". Scout.; "2011 Team Ranking". Rivals.
