= 2010–11 Marquette Golden Eagles men's basketball team =

American college basketball season

2010–11 Marquette Golden Eagles men's basketball
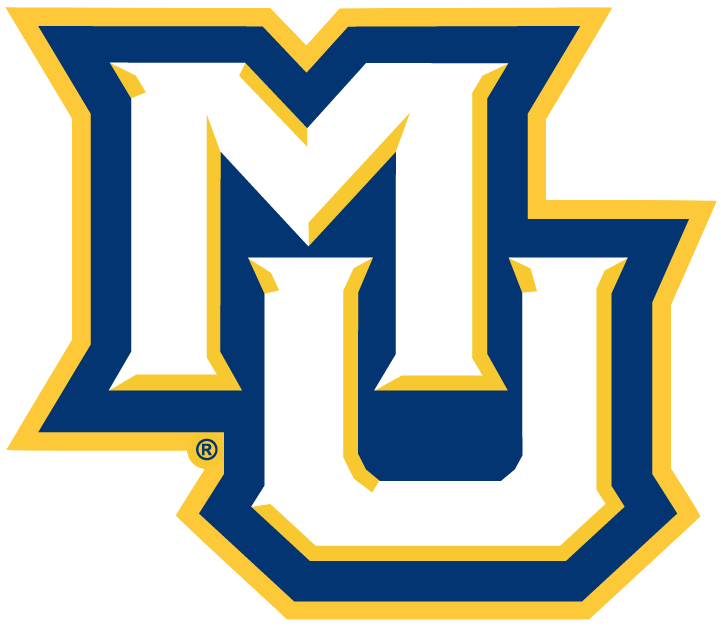

NCAA Tournament, Sweet Sixteen
- Conference: Big East Conference (1979–2013)

Ranking
- Coaches: No. 20
- Record: 22–15 (9–9 Big East)
- Head coach: Buzz Williams (3rd season)
- Assistant coaches: Tony Benford; Aki Collins; Scott Monarch
- Home arena: Bradley Center

2010–11 Big East men's basketball standings
	Conf.				Overall
Team	W		L	PCT	W		L	PCT
No. 4 Pittsburgh	15	–	3	.833	28	–	6	.824
No. 5 Notre Dame	14	–	4	.778	27	–	7	.794
*No. 12 Syracuse	12	–	6	.667	27	–	8	.771
No. 14 Louisville	12	–	6	.667	25	–	10	.714
No. 18 St. John's	12	–	6	.667	21	–	12	.636
Cincinnati	11	–	7	.611	26	–	9	.743
No. 22 West Virginia	11	–	7	.611	21	–	12	.636
Georgetown	10	–	8	.556	21	–	11	.656
No. 9 Connecticut†	9	–	9	.500	32	–	9	.780
Villanova	9	–	9	.500	21	–	12	.636
Marquette	9	–	9	.500	22	–	15	.595
Seton Hall	7	–	11	.389	13	–	18	.419
Rutgers	5	–	13	.278	15	–	17	.469
Providence	4	–	14	.222	15	–	17	.469
South Florida	3	–	15	.167	10	–	23	.303
DePaul	1	–	17	.056	7	–	24	.226
† 2011 Big East tournament winner As of April 4, 2011; *Syracuse:: 7 wins vacated due to sanctions against the program; Disputed record: Syracuse–(27–8)(10–6); Rankings from AP Poll

The 2010–11 Marquette Golden Eagles men's basketball team represented Marquette University in the 2010–11 NCAA Division I men's basketball season. Marquette were coached by Buzz Williams in his second year at the school, and played their home games at the Bradley Center in Milwaukee as members of the Big East Conference. They finished the season 22–15, 9–9 in Big East play to finish in a three-way tie for ninth place. They lost in the quarterfinals of the Big East tournament to Louisville. They received an at-large bid to the NCAA tournament, where they defeated Xavier and Syracuse to advance to the Sweet Sixteen, where they were defeated by North Carolina.

== Previous season ==
The Golden Eagles finished the 2009–10 season 22–12, 11–7 in Big East play to finish in a tie for fifth place. They received an at-large bid to the NCAA tournament, where they lost in the first round to Washington.

== Preseason ==
On June 24, former Marquette star Lazar Hayward was selected by the Washington Wizards with the 30th pick of the first round of the 2010 NBA draft. Shortly thereafter, he and Nemanja Bjelica were traded to the Minnesota Timberwolves in exchange for Trevor Booker and Hamady Ndiaye.

On October 20, 2010, at Big East Media Day, Marquette was picked to finish in an eighth-place tie with Louisville in the Big East Preseason Coaches' Poll, receiving 121 points.

== Roster ==
#	Name	Height	Weight (lbs.)	Position	Class	Hometown	Previous team(s)
0	Jamil Wilson	6'7"	210	F	So.	Racine, Wisconsin	Horlick HS/University of Oregon
1	Darius Johnson-Odom	6'2"	200	G	Jr.	Raleigh, North Carolina	Wakefield HS/Hutchinson CC
2	Vander Blue	6'4"	190	G	Fr.	Madison, Wisconsin	Madison Memorial HS
4	Reggie Smith	6'0"	175	G	Fr.	Chicago, Illinois	Thornton Township HS
5	Junior Cadougan	6'1"	205	G	So.	Toronto, Ontario	Christian Life Center Academy
12	Erik Williams	6'7"	200	F	So.	Houston, Texas	Cypress Springs HS
21	Joseph Fulce	6'7"	205	F	Sr.	Plano, Texas	Plano Senior HS/Tyler JC
22	Jamail Jones	6'6"	210	G/F	Fr.	Atlanta, Georgia	Montverde Academy
23	Dwight Buycks	6'3"	190	G	Sr.	Milwaukee, Wisconsin	Bay View HS/Indian Hills CC
25	Dave Singleton	6'4"	190	G	Jr.	Coatesville, Pennsylvania	The Hill School/High Point University
32	Jae Crowder	6'6"	225	F	Jr.	Villa Rica, Georgia	Villa Rica HS/Howard College
33	Jimmy Butler	6'6"	215	G/F	Sr.	Tomball, Texas	Tomball HS/Tyler JC
42	Chris Otule	6'10"	250	C	So.	Richmond, Texas	Fort Bend HS
45	Robert Frozena	6'1"	190	G	Sr.	Sherwood, Wisconsin	St. Mary Central HS
54	Davante Gardner	6'8"	290	F	Fr.	Suffolk, Virginia	King's Fork HS

== Schedule and results ==
Date time, TV	Rank^{#}	Opponent^{#}	Result	Record	Site (attendance) city, state
Exhibition
11/6/10*; 1:00 pm		Saint John's (MN)	W 85–56	—	Bradley Center (13,521); Milwaukee
Regular season
11/12/10*; 8:00 pm, Sports32		Prairie View A&M	W 97–58	1–0	Bradley Center (14,046); Milwaukee
11/14/10*; 1:00 pm, Sports32		Bucknell; CBE Classic	W 72–61	2–0	Bradley Center (13,783); Milwaukee
11/17/10*; 8:00 pm, Sports32		Green Bay; CBE Classic	W 89–69	3–0	Bradley Center (13,968); Milwaukee
11/20/10*; 1:00 pm		South Dakota	W 82–69	4–0	Bradley Center (14,117); Milwaukee
11/22/10*; 6:30 pm, ESPN2		vs. No. 1 Duke; CBE Classic	L 77–82	4–1	Sprint Center (18,660); Kansas City, Missouri
11/23/10*; 6:45 pm, ESPNU		vs. No. 22 Gonzaga; CBE Classic	L 63–66	4–2	Sprint Center (18,696); Kansas City, Missouri
11/27/10*; 8:00 pm, Sports32		at Milwaukee	W 75–72	5–2	US Cellular Arena (7,120); Milwaukee
12/4/10*; 1:00 pm		Longwood	W 96–65	6–2	Bradley Center (13,869); Milwaukee
12/7/10*; 8:00 pm, Sports32		Texas A&M–Corpus Christi	W 86–50	7–2	Bradley Center (13,505); Milwaukee
12/11/10*; 1:30 pm, ESPN2		Wisconsin	L 64–69	7–3	Bradley Center (19,074); Milwaukee
12/18/2010*; 1:00 pm, Sports32		Centenary	W 81–52	8–3	Bradley Center (14,116); Milwaukee
12/21/10*; 7:00 pm, Sports32		Mississippi Valley State	W 102–77	9–3	Bradley Center (13,930); Milwaukee
12/29/10*; 8:00 pm, ESPN2		at No. 24 Vanderbilt	L 76–77	9–4	Memorial Gymnasium (13,604); Nashville, Tennessee
1/1/11; 10:00 am, ESPN2		West Virginia	W 79–74	10–4 (1–0)	Bradley Center (15,575); Milwaukee
1/5/11; 6:30 pm, Sports32		at Rutgers	W 73–65	11–4 (2–0)	The RAC (5,358); Piscataway, New Jersey
1/8/11; 1:00 pm, Sports32		at No. 5 Pittsburgh	L 81–89	11–5 (2–1)	Petersen Events Center (11,438); Pittsburgh
1/10/11; 6:00 pm, ESPN2		No. 9 Notre Dame	W 79–57	12–5 (3–1)	Bradley Center (16,951); Milwaukee
1/15/11; 10:00 am, ESPN2		at No. 17 Louisville	L 70–71	12–6 (3–2)	KFC Yum! Center (21,485); Louisville, Kentucky
1/18/11; 8:00 pm, ESPNU		DePaul	W 94–64	13–6 (4–2)	Bradley Center (15,091); Milwaukee
1/22/11; 6:00 pm, Sports32		at No. 16 Notre Dame	L 75–80	13–7 (4–3)	Edmund P. Joyce Center (9,149); South Bend, Indiana
1/25/11; 8:00 pm, Sports32		No. 5 Connecticut	L 68–76	13–8 (4–4)	Bradley Center (15,476); Milwaukee
1/29/11; 2:00 pm, ESPNU		No. 9 Syracuse	W 76–70	14–8 (5–4)	Bradley Center (19,032); Milwaukee
2/2/11; 6:00 pm, ESPNU		at No. 12 Villanova	L 70–75	14–9 (5–5)	The Pavilion (6,500); Villanova, Pennsylvania
2/9/11; 6:00 pm, ESPN2		at South Florida	W 59–58	15–9 (6–5)	USF Sun Dome (4,153); Tampa, Florida
2/13/11; 12:00 pm, ESPN		at No. 11 Georgetown	L 60–69	15–10 (6–6)	Verizon Center (14,284); Washington, D.C.
2/15/11; 8:00 pm, ESPNU		St. John's	L 68–80	15–11 (6–7)	Bradley Center (17,270); Milwaukee
2/19/11; 8:00 pm, Sports32		Seton Hall	W 73–64	16–11 (7–7)	Bradley Center (18,436); Milwaukee
2/24/11; 6:00 pm, ESPN		at No. 14 Connecticut	W 74–67 ^{OT}	17–11 (8–7)	XL Center (14,622); Hartford, Connecticut
2/27/11; 3:00 pm, Sports32		Providence	W 86–62	18–11 (9–7)	Bradley Center (16,768); Milwaukee
3/2/11; 7:00 pm, Sports32		Cincinnati	L 60–67	18–12 (9–8)	Bradley Center (15,538); Milwaukee
3/5/11; 5:00 pm, ESPN3		at Seton Hall	L 72–85	18–13 (9–9)	Prudential Center (8,347); Newark, New Jersey
Big East tournament
3/8/11; 8:47 pm, ESPNU	(11)	vs. (14) Providence; Big East First Round	W 87–66	19–13	Madison Square Gardens (19,375); New York City
3/9/11; 8:27 pm, ESPN	(11)	vs. (6) No. 20 West Virginia; Big East Second Round	W 67–61	20–13	Madison Square Gardens (19,375); New York
3/10/11; 8:26 pm, ESPN	(11)	vs. (3) No. 14 Louisville; Big East Quarterfinals	L 56–81	20–14	Madison Square Gardens (19,375); New York
NCAA tournament
3/18/11*; 6:50 pm, truTV	(11 E)	vs. (6 E) No. 20 Xavier; NCAA Second Round	W 66–55	21–14	Quicken Loans Arena (20,164); Cleveland, Ohio
3/20/11*; 6:40 pm, truTV	(11 E)	vs. (3 E) No. 12 Syracuse; NCAA Third Round	W 66–62	22–14	Quicken Loans Arena (20,164); Cleveland, Ohio
3/25/11*; 6:15 pm, CBS	(11 E)	vs. (2 E) No. 7 North Carolina; NCAA Sweet Sixteen	L 63–81	22–15	Prudential Center (18,343); Newark, New Jersey
*Non-conference game. ^{#}Rankings from AP Poll. (#) Tournament seedings in parentheses. E=NCAA East Regional. All times are in Central Time.
