= 2010–11 Louisville Cardinals men's basketball team =

American college basketball season

2010–11 Louisville Cardinals men's basketball

NCAA tournament, Round of 64
- Conference: Big East Conference (1979–2013)

Ranking
- Coaches: No. 22
- AP: No. 14
- Record: 25–10 (12–6 Big East)
- Head coach: Rick Pitino (10th season)
- Assistant coaches: Ralph Willard; Steve Masiello; Tim Fuller; Mark Lieberman
- Home arena: KFC Yum! Center

2010–11 Big East men's basketball standings
	Conf.				Overall
Team	W		L	PCT	W		L	PCT
No. 4 Pittsburgh	15	–	3	.833	28	–	6	.824
No. 5 Notre Dame	14	–	4	.778	27	–	7	.794
*No. 12 Syracuse	12	–	6	.667	27	–	8	.771
No. 14 Louisville	12	–	6	.667	25	–	10	.714
No. 18 St. John's	12	–	6	.667	21	–	12	.636
Cincinnati	11	–	7	.611	26	–	9	.743
No. 22 West Virginia	11	–	7	.611	21	–	12	.636
Georgetown	10	–	8	.556	21	–	11	.656
No. 9 Connecticut†	9	–	9	.500	32	–	9	.780
Villanova	9	–	9	.500	21	–	12	.636
Marquette	9	–	9	.500	22	–	15	.595
Seton Hall	7	–	11	.389	13	–	18	.419
Rutgers	5	–	13	.278	15	–	17	.469
Providence	4	–	14	.222	15	–	17	.469
South Florida	3	–	15	.167	10	–	23	.303
DePaul	1	–	17	.056	7	–	24	.226
† 2011 Big East tournament winner As of April 4, 2011; *Syracuse:: 7 wins vacated due to sanctions against the program; Disputed record: Syracuse–(27–8)(10–6); Rankings from AP Poll

The 2010–11 Louisville Cardinals men's basketball team represented the University of Louisville during the 2010–11 NCAA Division I men's basketball season, Louisville's 97th season of intercollegiate competition. The Cardinals competed in the Big East Conference and were coached by Rick Pitino, who was in his 10th season. The team played its home games on Denny Crum Court at the KFC Yum! Center, their first season at the new arena after 54 years at Freedom Hall.

The team finished the season 25–10, 12–6 in Big East play (3rd-T) and lost in the championship game of the 2011 Big East men's basketball tournament to Connecticut. They received an at-large bid and a #4 seed in the 2011 NCAA Division I men's basketball tournament where they were upset in the second round by #13 seeded Morehead State.

== Preseason ==
=== Departures ===
Name	Number	Pos.	Height	Weight	Year	Hometown	Notes
Chris Smith	11	G	6'4"	175	Senior	Manchester, New Hampshire	Graduated
Reginald Delk	12	G	6'4"	175	Senior	Jackson, Tennessee	Graduated
Samardo Samuels	15	F	6'8"	240	Sophomore	Trelawny, Jamaica	Entered the 2010 NBA draft
Jerry Smith	34	G	6'1"	200	Senior	Wauwatosa, Wisconsin	Graduated
Edgar Sosa	10	G	6'1"	200	Senior	Bronx, New York	Graduated

=== Class of 2010 signees ===
College recruiting
Name	Hometown	School	Height	Weight	Commit date
Gorgui Dieng; PF	Kebemer, Senegal	Huntington Prep (WV)	6 ft 10 in (2.08 m)	205 lb (93 kg)	Apr 29, 2010
Gorgui Dieng; PF	Recruit ratings: Scout: Rivals: (91)				
Elisha Justice; PG	Pikeville, KY	Shelby Valley High School (KY)	5 ft 11 in (1.80 m)	167 lb (76 kg)	Apr 2, 2010
Elisha Justice; PG	Recruit ratings: Scout: Rivals: (88)				
Russ Smith; PG	Briarwood, NY	South Kent School (CT)	5 ft 10 in (1.78 m)	150 lb (68 kg)	Nov 15, 2009
Russ Smith; PG	Recruit ratings: Scout: Rivals: (POST)				
Overall recruit ranking: Scout: NR Rivals: NR ESPN: NR
Note: In many cases, Scout, Rivals, 247Sports, On3, and ESPN may conflict in their listings of height and weight.; In these cases, the average was taken. ESPN grades are on a 100-point scale.; Sources: "Louisville Basketball Commitment List". Rivals.; "2011 Louisville Basketball Commitment List". Scout.; "ESPN". ESPN.; "Scout.com Team Recruiting Rankings". Scout.; "2011 Team Ranking". Rivals.

== Roster ==
2010–11 Louisville Cardinals men's basketball team
Players
Coaches

Pos.	#	Name	Height	Weight	Year	Hometown
F	0	George Goode	6 ft 8 in (2.03 m)	205 lb (93 kg)	RS Jr	Raytown, Missouri
G	2	Preston Knowles (C)	6 ft 1 in (1.85 m)	170 lb (77 kg)	Sr	Winchester, Kentucky
G	3	Peyton Siva	5 ft 10 in (1.78 m)	170 lb (77 kg)	So	Seattle, Washington
F	4	Rakeem Buckles	6 ft 8 in (2.03 m)	200 lb (91 kg)	So	Miami, Florida
G	5	Chris Smith	6 ft 3 in (1.91 m)	200 lb (91 kg)	RS Jr	Millstone, New Jersey
C	10	Gorgui Dieng	6 ft 10 in (2.08 m)	230 lb (104 kg)	Fr	Kebemer, Senegal
G	14	Kyle Kuric	6 ft 4 in (1.93 m)	185 lb (84 kg)	Jr	Evansville, Indiana
G	15	Tim Henderson	6 ft 2 in (1.88 m)	180 lb (82 kg)	Fr	Louisville, Kentucky
F	21	Jared Swopshire	6 ft 7 in (2.01 m)	215 lb (98 kg)	Jr	St. Louis, Missouri
G	22	Elisha Justice	5 ft 11 in (1.8 m)	170 lb (77 kg)	Fr	Dorton, Kentucky
F	23	Terrence Jennings	6 ft 10 in (2.08 m)	240 lb (109 kg)	Jr	Sacramento, California
G	24	Russ Smith	5 ft 10 in (1.78 m)	160 lb (73 kg)	Fr	Briarwood, New York
G	33	Mike Marra	6 ft 4 in (1.93 m)	190 lb (86 kg)	So	Esmond, Rhode Island
F	44	Stephen Van Treese	6 ft 8 in (2.03 m)	220 lb (100 kg)	So	Indianapolis, Indiana

Head coach

- Rick Pitino (UMass)

Assistant coach(es)

- Ralph Willard (Holy Cross)
- Tim Fuller (Wake Forest)
- Steve Masiello (Kentucky)
- Mark Lieberman (FIU)

Legend

- (C) Team captain
- (S) Suspended
- (I) Ineligible
- (W) Walk-on
- Injured
- Current redshirt

== Schedule ==
Date time, TV	Rank^{#}	Opponent^{#}	Result	Record	High points	High rebounds	High assists	Site (attendance) city, state
Exhibition
October 31, 2010*; 2:00 p.m., BEN/WHAS		Northern Kentucky	W 83–66	–	18 – Buckles	11 – Buckles/Dieng	5 – Siva	KFC Yum! Center (18,869); Louisville, KY
November 11, 2010*; 7:00 p.m., BEN/WHAS		Kentucky Wesleyan	W 96–54	–	22 – Marra	8 – Buckles/Van Treese	6 – Justice	KFC Yum! Center (19,227); Louisville, KY
Non-conference regular season
November 16, 2010*; 8:00 p.m., ESPN		No. 16 Butler	W 88–73	1–0	17 – Buckles	11 – Buckles	5 – Marra	KFC Yum! Center (22,723); Louisville, KY
November 20, 2010*; 7:00 p.m., BEN/WHAS		Jackson State; Global Sports Shootout	W 62–45	2–0	14 – Jennings	8 – Buckles	6 – Siva	KFC Yum! Center (22,289); Louisville, KY
November 22, 2010*; 7:00 p.m., BEN/WHAS		Chattanooga; Global Sports Shootout	W 106–65	3–0	14 – Knowles	6 – Jennings/Van Treese	6 – Justice	KFC Yum! Center (21,191); Louisville, KY
November 27, 2010*; 1:00 p.m., BEN/WHAS		Marshall; Global Sports Shootout	W 80–66	4–0	12 – Buckles/Marra/Siva	7 – Buckles	5 – Marra	KFC Yum! Center (21,262); Louisville, KY
December 1, 2010*; 7:00 p.m., ESPN3.com		FIU; Global Sports Shootout	W 92–55	5–0	18 – Knowles	8 – Buckles	3 – Four Players Tied With	KFC Yum! Center (20,866); Louisville, KY
December 4, 2010*; 1:00 p.m., BEN/WHAS		South Alabama	W 97–70	6–0	23 – Marra	14 – Buckles	4 – Siva	KFC Yum! Center (21,048); Louisville, KY
December 8, 2010*; 7:00 p.m., BEN/WHAS	No. 24	San Francisco	W 61–35	7–0	14 – Jennings/Siva	10 – Buckles	5 – Siva	KFC Yum! Center (21,049); Louisville, KY
December 11, 2010*; 12:00 p.m., ESPNU	No. 24	No. 20 UNLV; Billy Minardi Classic	W 77–69	8–0	20 – Knowles	7 – Jennings	7 – Siva	KFC Yum! Center (22,489); Louisville, KY
December 14, 2010*; 9:00 p.m., ESPNU	No. 20	Drexel	L 46–52	8–1	13 – Knowles/Siva	6 – Buckles	2 – Kuric/Siva	KFC Yum! Center (20,912); Louisville, KY
December 18, 2010*; 3:30 p.m., BEN/WHAS	No. 20	Gardner–Webb	W 78–49	9–1	24 – Knowles	11 – Dieng	7 – Siva	KFC Yum! Center (20,434); Louisville, KY
December 22, 2010*; 8:00 p.m., Fox College Sports		at Western Kentucky	W 114–82	10–1	29 – Siva	6 – Buckles/C. Smith	8 – Siva	E.A. Diddle Arena (7,326); Bowling Green, KY
December 27, 2010*; 7:00 p.m., BEN/WHAS	No. 22	Morgan State	W 104–74	11–1	31 – Knowles	6 – Buckles/Dieng	7 – Siva	KFC Yum! Center (21,688); Louisville, KY
December 31, 2010*; 12:00 p.m., CBS	No. 22	No. 11 Kentucky; Battle for the Bluegrass	L 63–78	11–2	22 – Knowles	6 – C. Smith	4 – C. Smith	KFC Yum! Center (22,803); Louisville, KY
Big East Regular Season
January 5, 2011; 7:00 p.m., ESPNU		Seton Hall	W 73–54	12–2	14 – Marra/Siva	10 – Van Treese	5 – Knowles	KFC Yum! Center (21,912); Louisville, KY
January 9, 2011; 12:00 p.m., BEN/WHAS		at South Florida	W 86–77	13–2	12 – Jennings/Knowles/Van Treese	14 – Van Treese	6 – Siva	USF Sun Dome (4,375); Tampa, FL
January 12, 2011; 7:00 p.m., ESPN	No. 18	at No. 7 Villanova	L 74–88	13–3	24 – Knowles	6 – Knowles	8 – Siva	Wells Fargo Center (13,199); Philadelphia, PA
January 15, 2011; 11:00 a.m., ESPN2	No. 18	Marquette	W 71–70	14–3	17 – Knowles	8 – Jennings	4 – C. Smith/Siva	KFC Yum! Center (21,485); Louisville, KY
January 19, 2011; 7:00 p.m., BEN/WHAS	No. 19	St. John's	W 88–63	15–3	25 – Knowles	6 – C. Smith	10 – Siva	KFC Yum! Center (21,638); Louisville, KY
January 22, 2011; 5:00 p.m., ESPNU	No. 19	at Providence	L 67–72	15–4	19 – C. Smith	7 – C. Smith	5 – Marra	Dunkin' Donuts Center (12,051); Providence, RI
January 26, 2011; 7:00 p.m., ESPNU	No. 23	West Virginia	W 55–54	16–4	15 – C. Smith	9 – Jennings	6 – Knowles	KFC Yum! Center (21,957); Louisville, KY
January 29, 2011; 12:00 p.m., BEN/WHAS	No. 23	at No. 5 Connecticut	W 79–78 ^{2OT}	17–4	19 – Siva	10 – Jennings	8 – Siva	Harry A. Gampel Pavilion (10,167); Storrs, CT
January 31, 2011; 7:00 p.m., ESPN	No. 15	at No. 13 Georgetown; Big Monday	L 59–62	17–5	18 – Jennings	7 – Jennings	4 – C. Smith	Verizon Center (12,164); Washington, DC
February 5, 2011; 8:00 p.m., BEN/WHAS	No. 15	DePaul	W 61–57	18–5	19 – Kuric	8 – Jennings/Marra	10 – Siva	KFC Yum! Center (21,704); Louisville, KY
February 9, 2011; 7:00 p.m., ESPNU	No. 16	at No. 8 Notre Dame	L 79–89 ^{OT}	18–6	28 – Kuric	7 – Jennings	7 – Siva	Edmund P. Joyce Center (8,659); South Bend, IN
February 12, 2011; 12:00 p.m., ESPN	No. 16	No. 12 Syracuse	W 73–69	19–6	23 – Kuric	7 – Buckles/Jennings	6 – Siva	KFC Yum! Center (22,755); Louisville, KY
February 16, 2011; 7:00 p.m., ESPN	No. 16	at Cincinnati	L 54–63	19–7	14 – Jennings	8 – Kuric	4 – Knowles	Fifth Third Arena (11,511); Cincinnati, OH
February 18, 2011; 9:00 p.m., ESPN	No. 16	No. 13 Connecticut	W 71–58	20–7	15 – Siva	12 – Dieng	7 – Knowles	KFC Yum! Center (22,776); Louisville, KY
February 22, 2011; 9:00 p.m., ESPNU	No. 16	at Rutgers	W 55–37	21–7	14 – Knowles	7 – Knowles/Kuric	2 – Four tied with	Louis Brown Athletic Center (5,688); Piscataway, NJ
February 27, 2011; 2:00 p.m., CBS	No. 16	No. 4 Pittsburgh	W 62–59 ^{OT}	22–7	14 – Siva	7 – Kuric	7 – Knowles	KFC Yum! Center (22,758); Louisville, KY
March 2, 2011; 7:00 p.m., BEN/WHAS	No. 11	Providence; Senior Night	W 87–60	23–7	25 – Kuric	10 – Knowles	7 – Siva	KFC Yum! Center (22,724); Louisville, KY
March 5, 2011; 12:00 p.m., ESPN	No. 11	at West Virginia	L 70–72	23–8	21 – Kuric	4 – Jennings/Siva	6 – Siva	WVU Coliseum (15,032); Morgantown, WV
2011 Big East tournament
March 10, 2011; 9:00PM, ESPN/ESPN 3D	No. 14	vs. Marquette; Quarterfinals	W 81–56	24–8	22 – Marra	11 – C. Smith	8 – Siva	Madison Square Garden (18,258); New York City, NY
March 11, 2011; 9:00PM, ESPN/ESPN 3D	No. 14	vs. No. 4 Notre Dame; Semifinals	W 83–77 ^{OT}	25–8	20 – Knowles	8 – Dieng	7 – Siva	Madison Square Garden (18,984); New York City, NY
March 12, 2011; 9:00PM, ESPN/ESPN 3D	No. 14	vs. No. 21 Connecticut; Championship Game	L 66–69	25–9	18 – Knowles	7 – Siva	7 – Siva	Madison Square Garden (19,375); New York City, NY
2011 NCAA tournament
March 17, 2011*; 1:40PM, TBS	No. 14 (SE 4)	vs. (SE 13) Morehead State; Second Round	L 61–62	25–10	17 – Smith	5 – Smith/Kuric	5 – Knowles	Pepsi Center (18,499); Denver, CO
*Non-conference game. ^{#}Rankings from AP Poll. (#) Tournament seedings in parentheses. All times are in Eastern Time (#) during NCAA Tournament is seed with Region.
