= Kevin Noreen =

American basketball player (born 1992)

Personal information
- Born: June 3, 1992 (age 34)
- Listed height: 6 ft 10 in (2.08 m)
- Listed weight: 250 lb (113 kg)

Career information
- High school: Minnesota Transitions Charter School (Minneapolis, Minnesota)
- College: West Virginia (2010–2015)
- NBA draft: 2015: undrafted
- Position: Forward

Career highlights
- Minnesota Mr. Basketball (2010); Gatorade Minnesota Player of the Year (2010)

Kevin Noreen (born 1992) is an American basketball player from Minnesota. Noreen played high school basketball at Minnesota Transitions Charter School and broke the state scoring record with an unofficial career total of 4,086 points. In his senior year, he also led the team to the 2010 Class A state championship in Minnesota; he led all scorers in the championship game against Sebeka High School with 24 points, and was named to the All-Tournament team. Kevin Noreen was also named Mr. Basketball in Minnesota in 2010, as well as the Gatorade Minnesota Boys Basketball Player of the Year. Noreen initially committed to play basketball at Boston College, but was allowed to retract his commitment after coach Al Skinner was fired. Noreen then agreed to play for West Virginia. In four seasons at WVU, Noreen appeared in 94 games, averaging 2.4 points and 3.2 rebounds per game.
