= List of Kent School people =

This list contains notable people associated with Kent School in Kent, Connecticut, including alumni and current and former faculty.

== Alumni ==
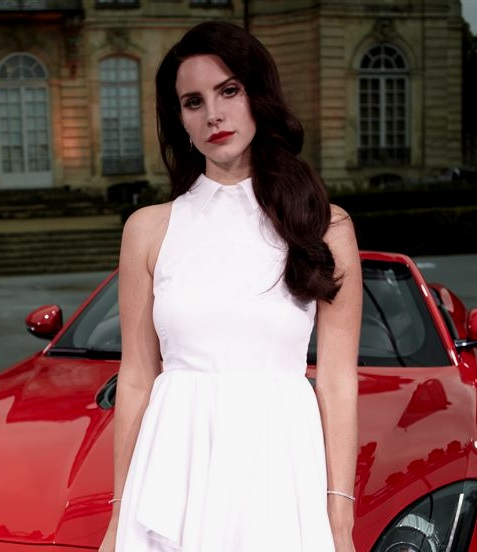
Lana Del Rey

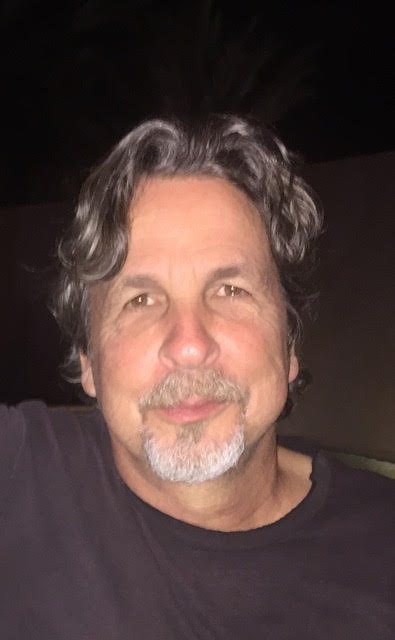
Director Peter Farrelly

=== Arts and entertainment ===
- Richard Arnest, class of 1968, composer, performer
- Newman Taylor Baker, class of 1961, percussionist, composer
- John Biddle, yachting cinematographer and lecturer; inducted into America's Cup Hall of Fame
- Lawrence Casserley, class of 1959, composer, performer, conductor
- Frankie Celenza, class of 2005, Daytime Emmy Award winning cooking show host, author
- Alicia Coppola, class of 1986, actress
- Ted Danson, class of 1966, Emmy and Golden Globe winning actor, notably in Cheers
- Lana Del Rey (Elizabeth Grant), class of 2003, singer
- Sean Durkin, class of 2000, film director
- Emme (Melissa Aronson), class of 1981, plus-size supermodel
- Peter Farrelly, class of 1975, writer, producer, director (Outside Providence, Dumb and Dumber)
- Mamie Gummer, class of 2001, (daughter of Meryl Streep), actress
- Robert Hillyer, class of 1913, Pulitzer Prize winning poet
- Joseph Kaiser, class of 1995, Metropolitan Opera star, operatic tenor
- Seth MacFarlane, class of 1991, actor, voice actor, animator, writer, producer, director, singer, comedian (best known for creating Family Guy)
- Grayson McCouch, class of 1987, actor
- Daniel Richter, choreographer, actor 2001: A Space Odyssey
- Roger Sessions, class of 1911, composer, critic, teacher of music
- Barclay Shaw, class of 1968, artist
- Mandy Stein, class of 1994, film producer
- KT Tunstall, class of 1993, musician
- Will Wallace, class of 1984, film director
- Treat Williams, class of 1969, actor

=== Athletics ===
- Christine Roper, class of 2007, Canadian rower, won the gold medal in the women's eight in the 2020 summer olympics
- Johnny Bent, class of 1926, silver medalist with the American hockey team in the 1932 Winter Olympics
- Étienne Boulay, class of 2002, Canadian football player
- Jack Capuano, class of 1985, Head Coach, New York Islanders
- Steve Gladstone, class of 1960, rowing coach
- Billy Jaffe, class of 1987, sports analyst
- Ryan Leib, professional soccer player
- H. Graham Motion, class of 1983, horse trainer
- Christophe Mulumba-Tshimanga, Canadian football player
- Winthrop Palmer, class of 1926, silver medalist with the American hockey team in the 1932 Winter Olympics
- Scott Perry, NFL football player
- Carl-Olivier Primé, Canadian football player
- David Quinn, class of 1984, hockey player for Minnesota North Stars, Former head coach for Boston University, former Head Coach of the New York Rangers, and current head coach of the San Jose Sharks.
- William Stowe, class of 1958, Olympic gold medalist in rowing
- Noel Acciari. class of 2011, NHL Boston Bruins 2015 – 2019 Florida Panthers 2019 - Current
- Cristoval Nieves "Boo", class of 2012, NHL New York Rangers (2016 – 2020) and Tampa Bay Lightning (2021–present)

=== Business ===
- Jonathan Harmsworth, 4th Viscount Rothermere, Chairman of Daily Mail and General Trust (post-graduate year)

=== Engineering and science ===
- Craig Call Black, class of 1950, paleontologist
- Thomas Elliot Bowman III, class of 1938, carcinologist
- Schuyler V. Cammann, class of 1931, anthropologist
- Flemming Gomme Graae, class of 1967, psychiatrist
- John S. Meyer, class of 1941, neurologist
- Ilhi Synn, class of 1958, educator
- John Hunter Thomas, class of 1945, botanist
- Bruno H. Zimm, class of 1938, polymer chemist and DNA researcher

=== Government, politics, and law ===
- John A. Baldwin, Jr., class of 1950, United States Navy Vice Admiral
- Jacob D. Beam, U.S. Ambassador to the Soviet Union, 1969–73
- His Royal Highness Prince Carl Philip Edmund Bertil, Duke of Värmland, third in line to the Swedish throne (left in his tenth year to attend finishing school)
- Christopher Burnham, class of 1975, diplomat
- Peter Carlisle, class of 1970, Mayor and former Prosecuting Attorney of Honolulu
- Richard Dearlove, class of 1963, former Chief of MI6, British Secret Intelligence Service (1999–2004)
- Alexandra Davis DiPentima, class of 1971, Chief Judge of the Connecticut Appellate Court
- Hamilton Fish IV, Congressman from New York, 1969–95
- Howard Hart, class of 1958, Central Intelligence Agency officer
- Draper Kauffman, class of 1929, Navy Rear Admiral; considered the father of Navy Frogmen; grandfather of Navy SEALs
- Stewart McKinney, Congressman from Connecticut
- Stephanie Nyombayire, class of 2004, activist
- Carlton Powell, class of 1957, judge
- Whitney North Seymour Jr., U.S. Attorney for the Southern District of New York, prominent lawyer, New York State Senator
- John A. Shaw, class of 1957, former civil servant who held positions under several presidents
- J. Fife Symington Jr., class of 1929, airline pioneer and former US Ambassador to Trinidad and Tobago
- Cyrus Vance, class of 1935, former US Secretary of State
- Tommy Vitolo, class of 1996, member of the Massachusetts House of Representatives, 2019–present
- Michael Webert, class of 1998, member of the Virginia House of Delegates, 2012–present
- Dinghy Young, class of 1932, World War II "Dambuster" pilot
- Marie L. Yovanovitch, class of 1976, diplomat, U.S. Department of State official, U.S. Ambassador to Armenia, Kyrgyzstan, and Ukraine

=== Writers, journalists and publishers ===
- Bruce Beattie, class of 1972, political cartoonist
- John Brooks, class of 1938, writer
- Oliver Butterworth, class of 1933, writer and educator
- James Gould Cozzens, class of 1925, novelist, Pulitzer Prize recipient in 1949 for Guard of Honor; wrote By Love Possessed
- Wilbur Cross, class of 1937, author
- Vine Deloria, Jr. (Standing Rock Sioux), class of 1951, author (Custer Died for Your Sins, 1969), theologian, historian, and Native American activist
- Chard deNiord, class of 1971, poet, poet laureate of Vermont
- P. G. Downes, class of 1928, explorer, educator, author
- Rowland Evans, class of 1939, columnist, journalist, co-host of Evans & Novak on CNN
- Oscar Gonzáles, class of 1989, writer
- Ashbel Green, class of 1945, editor at Alfred A. Knopf
- James Grinwis, class of 1990, poet
- Robert Hillyer, class of 1913, poet
- Stu Kennedy, class of 1946, historian
- Charles P. Kindleberger, class of 1928, historical economist, author
- Sidney D. Kirkpatrick, award-winning documentary filmmaker and bestselling historical author
- Alfred W. McCoy, class of 1964, historian
- Christopher McDougall, class of 1981, bestselling author
- Charles Patterson, author and historian
- John Rawls, class of 1939, political philosopher, author of A Theory of Justice
- Bernard Ryan, Jr., class of 1942, author
- Serge Schmemann, class of 1963, reporter, Pulitzer Prize for International Reporting recipient in 1991
- Frank W. Wadsworth, class of 1938, scholar, author, and sportsman

== Faculty ==
- William H. Armstrong, Greek and ancient history teacher for decades; author of Study is Hard Work and the novel Sounder, which received the Newbery Medal in 1970 and was made into an Oscar-nominated movie
- Joe Bouchard, music instructor, retired member of rock band Blue Öyster Cult
- Edmund Fuller
- Michael Page, equestrian
