= Taj =

Taj may refer to:

== Buildings ==
- Taj Mahal, a medieval mausoleum in the Indian city of Agra
- Taj Palace, an Abbasid palace in medieval Baghdad
- Taj-ul-Masajid, mosque in Bhopal
- Taj building, Nowshera, Pakistan
- Taj Hotels, international hotel chain
- The Taj Exotica Hotel & Resort, Dubai

== Transport ==
- Tadji Airport, Papua New Guinea (IATA: TAJ)
- Taj International Airport, proposed airport in Delhi
- Taj Express, train between New Delhi and Agra

== Sport ==
- Taj Ahvaz Football Club, Iranian football (soccer) club
- Taj Abadan Football Club, Iranian football (soccer) club
- Taj Tehran Football Club, Iranian football (soccer) club
- Taj F.C. (Palau), Palauan football team

== Other ==
- Taj (name), including a list of people with the name
- Taj Mahotsav, annual festival in Agra
- Taj Ultimate, annual "Ultimate" tournament in Tajima, Japan
- Taj Television Ltd., Mumbai
- Former name pre-1979 of Esteghlal Tehran FC, football club
- National Lampoon's Van Wilder: The Rise of Taj, 2006 film
- Taj corridor case, alleged corruption case in India
- Taqiyah (cap), a short, rounded skullcap
- Taj (album), a 1987 album by American blues artist Taj Mahal
- Taj: Divided by Blood, a ZEE5 web-series
- Tajikistan, UNDP country code

== See also ==
- Tahj (disambiguation)
- Taj Mahal (disambiguation)
