= South Kent School =

Boys school in South Kent, Connecticut, US

Coordinates: 41.6765°N 73.4792°W

Location
- 40 Bulls Bridge Road; South Kent, Connecticut 06785; United States

Information
- Type: Private, boarding
- Motto: Simplicity of Life, Self-Reliance, and Directness of Purpose
- Religious affiliation: Episcopal
- Established: 1923 (103 years ago)
- CEEB code: 070695
- Head of school: Brian D. Sullivan
- Grades: 9-12 & one year post-graduate
- Enrollment: 165 boarding
- Average class size: 10 students
- Student to teacher ratio: 5:1
- Colors: Cardinal and black
- Athletics: 8 interscholastic sports
- Nickname: Cardinals
- Website: southkentschool.org

South Kent School, a private all-boys boarding school in South Kent, Connecticut, United States, is located on a 650-acre (2.6 km^{2}) campus in western Litchfield County. It is sited on Spooner Hill east of Bull's Bridge, overlooking the former Housatonic Valley rail-line, Hatch Pond, and the 'whistle-stop' South Kent station, and is itself overlooked by Bull Mountain.

The school has an operating budget of approximately $14 million and a staff of less than 100. From its inception, South Kent School was intended to offer a service-oriented education "at minimum cost for boys of ability and character, who presumably on graduation must be self-supporting. " Its motto is "Simplicity of life, Self-reliance, and Directness of purpose".

== History ==
The hamlet of South Kent emerged in the mid-1700s on the "main road over Spooner Hill to Bull's Bridge", where Jacob Bull established an iron foundry; by 1800, an ironworks and forge were also set up near the outlet from Hatch Pond. When railroads came up the valley in the 1840s, efficient competition from western foundries shuttered the Connecticut iron industry. By 1920, the Kent area's population was half its Revolution-era level, and farm properties were available inexpensively.

The school was founded in 1923 as a joint venture between Reverend Frederick Herbert Sill, headmaster of Kent School, and two of his recent graduates, Samuel Slater Bartlett and Richard M. Cuyler. The Straight farm was purchased from members of the Judd family, and additions to the farmhouse were made to house a chapel, twenty-four students, and faculty. From the start, students provided labor for daily cleaning, occasional farm chores, maintenance, and unskilled construction. Over the years, buildings were added to the Straight property (dormitories, classrooms, a chapel, a library, an infirmary, faculty residences, &c.) and additional acreage was acquired. Most recently, the school purchased the defunct Arno farm on the Barnabus Hatch (d.1781) property at the north end of Hatch Pond, and is operating it as an educational farm.

Sam Bartlett became the first headmaster, serving for 45 years. Bartlett was followed as headmaster by conservationist L. Wynne Wister (1955–69), then George M. Bartlett (son of the first headmaster) through 1989. Peter Arango had a brief tenure, then Noble Richards '49 was headmaster until 1996. He was succeeded by John S. Farber (96–00), John C. Farr '58 (retired in 2003), then by Andrew J. Vadnais through 2018, then followed by Lawrence A. Smith '73. An independent board of trustees governs the school. South Kent School's most current head of school is Brian D. Sullivan.

== Admissions ==
Enrollment at the beginning of the 2025-26 school year was 165 young men worldwide in four "forms" (or grades). International students from twenty nations and U.S. students from nineteen states across America are represented.

== Curriculum ==
South Kent is a college-preparatory school; the course of study is designed with the intent that every student will continue his education at a higher-level institution.

In 2017–18, the school had 35 faculty members who offered 48 courses in 2 primary divisions: math/science and humanities. The school year is divided into fall, winter, and spring. Students typically enroll in five major academic courses each term. Accelerated courses, including advanced placement, are offered in more than a dozen subjects (several in conjunction with Syracuse University).

=== English as a second language ===
ESL is a program for international students to improve or reinforce their written and oral English skills. The focus is on structure, comprehension, and conversation. Nearly half of South Kent graduates have been non-native English speakers in recent years.

=== Center for Innovation ===
Due in part to its rural setting, the school has established a learning track focused on environmental management and entrepreneurship. Technologies range from historic architecture and building techniques to robotics and software design.

== Extracurricular activities ==
=== Athletics ===
Facilities available to students include The Admiral James & Sybil Stockdale Arena for hockey, the Joseph J. Brown gymnasium, the Alumni Boathouse on Hatch Pond for rowing, the Anne H. Funnell cross-country trail, the hard court tennis courts, a weight-training facility, numerous athletics fields, and the adjacent Tom Fazio-designed Bulls Bridge Golf Club.

=== Publications ===
- The Pigtail: a student publication issued three to five times yearly. The name of the paper is a reference to the nickname of the hamlet of South Kent as "Pigtail Corners" or simply "Pigtail". A slogan at the school for many years was "Pigtail Against the World".
- The Hillside: the South Kent School alum magazine is published twice annually.
- Cardinal News Network: a student-produced online publication that is updated continually. Cardinal News Network features the videos and stories created by students in the Digital Communications classes.

== Notable SKS people ==
For over one hundred years, the school has been home to slightly more 3,500 students, resident faculty and their families, and several other notables.

- Edmund Fuller, historian, editor, novelist; chairman of SKS English department 1971–78.
- Florence Maybrick, a notorious convicted murderess, is buried in the school cemetery.
- Martin H. M. Schreiber, photographer, did not graduate but retains his affiliation with the school and the class of 1965.
- Fr. Frederick Herbert Sill, (Anglican Order of the Holy Cross) initiated the founding of South Kent School seventeen years after he founded Kent School.
- Admiral James Stockdale, (Medal of Honor recipient, P.O.W., Vice-Presidential Candidate) & Mrs. Sybil Stockdale - parents of three SKS alumni. The ice hockey facility is named in their honor.

=== Distinguished alumni ===
- Jim Bellows (SKS 1940), Editor of the New York Herald-Tribune; major figure in the New Journalism.
- John Berryman (SKS 1932), Poet, (1965 Pulitzer for "77 Dream Songs", 1969 Bollingen & National Book Award for "His Toy, His Dream, His Rest")
- Gordon Clapp (SKS 1967), Emmy Award-winning actor and Tony Award nominee, best known for his role as Detective Medavoy on NYPD Blue
- Durand Echeverria (SKS 1931), historian, Fulbright and Guggenheim fellow, National Humanities Foundation awardee.
- William S Farish III (SKS 1958), US Ambassador to the UK 2001–2004
- Charles Coulston Gillispie (SKS 1935), Dayton-Stockton Professor of History Emeritus at Princeton University, seminal science historian
- Donald Purple Hart (SKS 1955), former bishop of the Episcopal Diocese of Hawaii
- Sukehiro Hasegawa (SKS 1962), U.N Administrator, led peacekeeping operations in Somalia, Rwanda, and East Timor
- Robert M. Laughlin (SKS 1952) Anthropologist, linguist, curator at the Smithsonian.
- Keith "Bang Bang" McCurdy (SKS (DNG 2004, Honorary diploma 2015), celebrity tattoo artist
- E. H. Beresford 'Chip' Monck (SKS 1958), lighting designer and stage manager, announcer for the 1969 Woodstock Festival
- Robert B. Oakley (SKS 1948), former US Ambassador to Pakistan, Somalia, and Zaire
- Neal Peirce (SKS 1950), Political columnist & editor: Congressional Quarterly, National Journal, The Washington Post Writers Group
- Charles Reid (SKS 1955), watercolorist
- Jonathan Richards (SKS 1958), novelist, actor, film critic, & political cartoonist
- Rt. Rev Samuel Rodman (SKS 1977), bishop of the Episcopal Diocese of North Carolina
- Martin Russ (SKS 1949), writer documenting the experience of U.S. combatants in the Korean War.
- Rathvon M. Tompkins (SKS 1931), Major General, USMC; commanded 3rd Marine Division in Vietnam 1967–71.

=== Athletes ===
Father Sill wrote in his proposal for the founding of Kent School that it would " provide...for boys of ability and character, who presumably on graduation must be self-supporting...Simplicity, self-reliance and directness...." Seventeen years later, he and his partners in the South Kent venture adopted the final phrase as the new school's motto.

In the early 2000s, Headmaster Vadnais and the Board recognized that young athletes with professional aspirations fit Father Sill's description, and many were likely to see high school as their final educational endeavor. The number of notable athletes who have graduated from South Kent has burgeoned during the 21st century. Alumni athletes who have proven outstanding include:

- Andray Blatche (SKS 2005), Former NBA basketball player
- Detre Bell (SKS 2015), Professional soccer player (Bermuda).
- Tahj Bell (SKS 2010), Professional soccer player (Bermuda).
- Gilbert Brown (SKS 2006), basketball player for Ironi Nahariya of the Israeli Basketball Premier League
- Jean-Pierre Brunet (SKS 1948), two time U.S. Figure Skating Championships pairs champion (1945 and 1946).
- Matthew Bryan-Amaning (SKS 2007), Professional basketball player (Great Britain)
- Jackie Carmichael (SKS 2009), Professional basketball player
- Choi Jin-soo (SKS 2008), Collegiate basketball player
- Paul Cummins (SKS 2003), Professional basketball player (Ireland).
- Nemanja Đurišić (SKS 2011), Professional basketball player (Basketball Bundesliga).
- Joel Farabee (SA.SKS 2018), Professional hockey player with the NHL Philadelphia Flyers.
- Mike Garzi (SKS 2009), MLS soccer player (retired).
- Jacob Fowler (SKS 2023), goaltender for NHL Montreal Canadiens.
- Shayne Gostisbehere, (SKS 2011), Philadelphia Flyers, NHL
- Maurice Harkless, (SKS 2011), NBA player
- Abdoulaye Harouna (SKS 2014), Nigerian basketball player
- David Hicks (SKS 2007), basketball player for Ironi Nahariya of the Israeli Basketball Premier League
- Elijah Hughes (SKS 2016), NBA basketball player for Portland Trail Blazers.
- Ricky Ledo (SKS 2012), Former NBA basketball player
- Jack McClinton (SKS 2004), Former NBA basketball player
- Wade Megan (SKS 2009), Former professional hockey player with the NHL St. Louis Blues.
- Jermaine 'Stretch' Middleton (SKS 2004), Harlem Globetrotters
- Tre Ming (SKS 2012), Professional soccer player, Bermuda.
- Brian Mueller (SKS 1991), Professional hockey coach and player, 2-time college All-American
- Narito Namizato (SKS 2009), Professional basketball player (Japan).
- Fabio Pereira (SKS 2010), MLS soccer player (retired).
- Mathias Emilio Pettersen (SA.SKS 2018), Professional hockey player with the NHL Calgary Flames.
- Shane Pinto (SKS 2017), professional hockey player with the NHL Ottawa Senators.
- Myles Powell (SKS 2016), basketball player for the Seton Hall Pirates men's basketball team. 2020 Big East Player of the Year. 2019-2020 Consensus First Team All-American.
- Pete Raymond (SKS 1964), US Olympic rower 1968 and (silver-medal) 1972
- Russell Smith (SKS 2010), currently plays in the Israeli Basketball Premier League, former Memphis Grizzlies, NBA; Louisville Cardinals Men's Basketball (2013 Big East All-Conference) 2013 NCAA Men's Division I Championship)
- Daichi Taniguchi (SKS 2010), Professional basketball player (Japan).
- Isaiah Thomas (SKS 2008), NBA (2016 & 2017 All-Star, 2017 All-NBA)
- Dorell Wright (SKS 2004), NBA player, broadcaster

Several notable athletes attended South Kent but graduated elsewhere; among them Nik Stauskas, NBA champion Dion Waiters, Tremont Waters, and Andrew Peeke.

== Accreditations and associations ==
South Kent School is accredited by the New England Association of Schools and Colleges and has held membership in District III of the Cum Laude Society for more than eighty years.

South Kent competes athletically as a member of the New England Preparatory School Athletic Council and the Hudson Valley Athletic League and adheres to all league guidelines. Students can participate in post-season tournaments and compete for league and New England titles.

The school also maintains membership in the National Association of Independent Schools, the National Association of Episcopal Schools, the Secondary School Admission Test Board, the Connecticut Association of Independent Schools, The Association of Boarding Schools, the International Coalition of Boys Schools and the National Association for College Admission Counseling.
