= Northwood University =

Private university in Midland, Michigan, US

- Former names: Northwood Institute (1959–1993)
- Type: Private university
- Established: 1959; 67 years ago
- Founders: Arthur Turner, Gary Stauffer
- Accreditation: HLC
- Endowment: $142.7 million (2025)
- Chair: Jennifer T. Panning
- President: Kent MacDonald
- Undergraduates: 2,116 (fall 2021)
- Postgraduates: 306 (fall 2021)
- Location: Midland, Michigan, U.S.
- Campus: 90 acres (36 ha); Suburban
- Publications: When Free to Choose (Newspaper); When We Are Free ISBN 978-0873590969
- Colors: NU Dark Blue & NU Light Blue
- Nickname: Timberwolves
- Sporting affiliations: NCAA Division II – G-MAC
- Mascot: "Woody" Timberwolf
- Website: northwood.edu
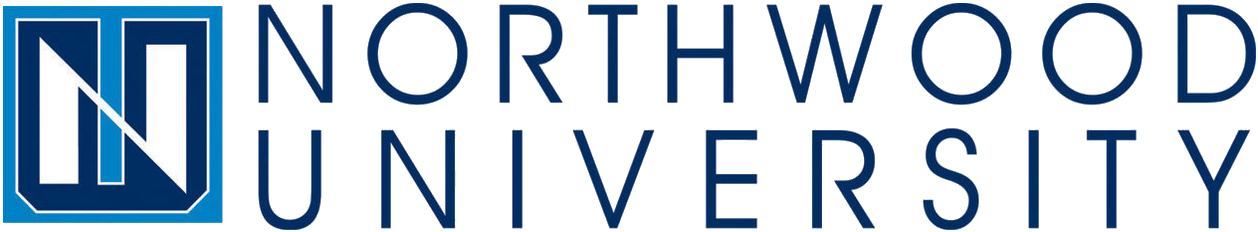
- Northwood University Campus Map

Northwood University (NU) is a private university in Midland, Michigan, United States, and online. Founded in 1959, the university specializes in business and management education, offering undergraduate and graduate programs across disciplines such as business administration, finance, accounting, marketing, entrepreneurship, hospitality and automotive-related business fields. As a business school, it offers bachelor's (BBA), master's (MBA & M.S.) and PhD degrees. More than 57,000 students have graduated from the institution.

== History ==
Northwood University opened as Northwood Institute in 1959 by Arthur E. Turner and R. Gary Stauffer. One hundred students enrolled at the new school, which was initially located in a 19th-century mansion in Alma, Michigan. Northwood Institute moved to Midland, Michigan, in 1961.

The Jesuits operated a seminary known as "West Baden College" at the former West Baden Springs Hotel, in Orange County, Indiana, from 1934 until June 1964, when declining enrollment forced the closure of the facility. They sold the property to a Michigan couple, who in turn donated it to Northwood Institute, which operated a satellite campus of their business management school, "Northwood University-West Baden", under the dome on the property from 1966 until 1983, when it was closed. During the same time frame during which the Indiana campus was opened, a Northwood facility was also established in Texas.

In 1982, David E. Fry became president of the school. The Florida residential campus was added, and the academic curricula were expanded. The school was accredited by the Higher Learning Commission.

In 1993, the name was changed from Northwood Institute to Northwood University and The DeVos Graduate School of Management was created. A joint program with the Hotel Institute Montreux was established in 2001 to combine Swiss hospitality traditions with American management practices. The school, located in Montreux, Switzerland was Northwood University's first international venture. University College program centers were expanded for a total of 40 locations in eight states and program centers were begun in Bahrain, China, Sri Lanka, and Switzerland.

In October 2007, Keith A. Pretty was named Northwood's third President and CEO. Kent MacDonald became president in 2019.

In 2014, Northwood announced that it would close its residential operations at its Texas location, while continuing to expand its adult degree program and graduate program there. A year later in 2015, the university sold its Florida location to Keiser University.

Since 2019, Northwood has expanded its online offerings, launched new industry-aligned business programs, and increased access to adult and professional learners through degree-completion pathways and graduate business education.

== Academics ==
Northwood University focuses on business and management education at the undergraduate, graduate, and doctoral levels. Academic offerings include bachelor's degree programs in areas such as business administration, accounting, finance, marketing, management, and automotive marketing and management.

The DeVos Graduate School of Management oversees Northwood's graduate and professional programs, including the Master of Business Administration (MBA) and the Doctor of Business Administration (DBA).

Northwood also operates online and hybrid programs for working professionals and degree-completion students. These include online business degree options at the bachelor's and master's levels, as well as accelerated pathways designed for learners with prior college credit or professional experience.

== Athletics ==
Northwood University sponsors intercollegiate athletics at the varsity and club levels. The university's athletic programs compete as the Northwood Timberwolves and primarily participate in the National Collegiate Athletic Association (NCAA) Division II.

=== Northwood Timberwolves ===
The Michigan campus fields Northwood's NCAA athletic teams. Since the 2022–23 academic year, the Timberwolves have competed in the Great Midwest Athletic Conference (G-MAC). Prior to joining the G-MAC, Northwood competed in the Great Lakes Intercollegiate Athletic Conference (GLIAC) from 1972–73 to 1986–87 and from 1992–93 to 2021–22.

Northwood currently sponsors 16 varsity sports:

- Men's sports: baseball, basketball, cross country, football, golf, soccer, tennis, and track and field
- Women's sports: basketball, cross country, golf, soccer, softball, tennis, track and field, and volleyball

The university also supports several club sports, including men's ice hockey. Northwood's athletic facilities include Hantz Stadium, Bennett Sports Center, Fisher Track, and a selection of indoor and outdoor practice venues.

In April 2021, the university announced its transition from the GLIAC to the G-MAC, effective July 2022.

== Midland campus ==
Northwood University's residential campus is located in Midland, Michigan. The 90-acre (36 ha) suburban campus includes academic buildings, residence halls, athletic facilities, and centers dedicated to business innovation and leadership development. Notable facilities include the Church Family Administration Building, the DeVos Graduate School of Management, the Alden B. Dow–designed Strosacker Library, and multiple specialized learning spaces for business analytics, entrepreneurship, automotive marketing, and experiential education.

The campus hosts a full range of student services, including dining facilities, student organizations, professional associations, and industry-aligned co-curricular programs. Northwood sponsors more than 40 student clubs and organizations, many of which focus on business, leadership, and industry-specific development.

Northwood's Midland campus is also home to the university's NCAA Division II athletic programs, known as the Timberwolves, which compete in the Great Midwest Athletic Conference (G-MAC). Athletic facilities include Hantz Stadium, Bennett Sports Center, Fisher Track, and additional indoor and outdoor training spaces.

== Notable alumni ==
- Jeffrey Ajluni, businessman
- Robb Brent, professional racecar driver
- Julie Calley, politician
- Rob Childress, college baseball coach
- Dick DeVos, politician
- Dan DeVos, businessman and sports executive
- Carole Gist, beauty pageant contestant
- Chedrick Greene, politician
- Rina Mohd Harun, politician
- Charleston Hughes, professional football player
- Maurice Jones, professional basketball player
- Blake Koch, professional racecar driver
- Lisa McClain, politician
- Jermaine Middleton, professional basketball player
- Candice Miller, politician
- Jerry Pettway, professional basketball player
- Deborah Renshaw, professional racear driver
- Jim Stamas, businessman and politician
- Chris Wilson, professional football player
- Ernie Zeigler, college basketball coach
- Ana Brnabić, politician from Serbia
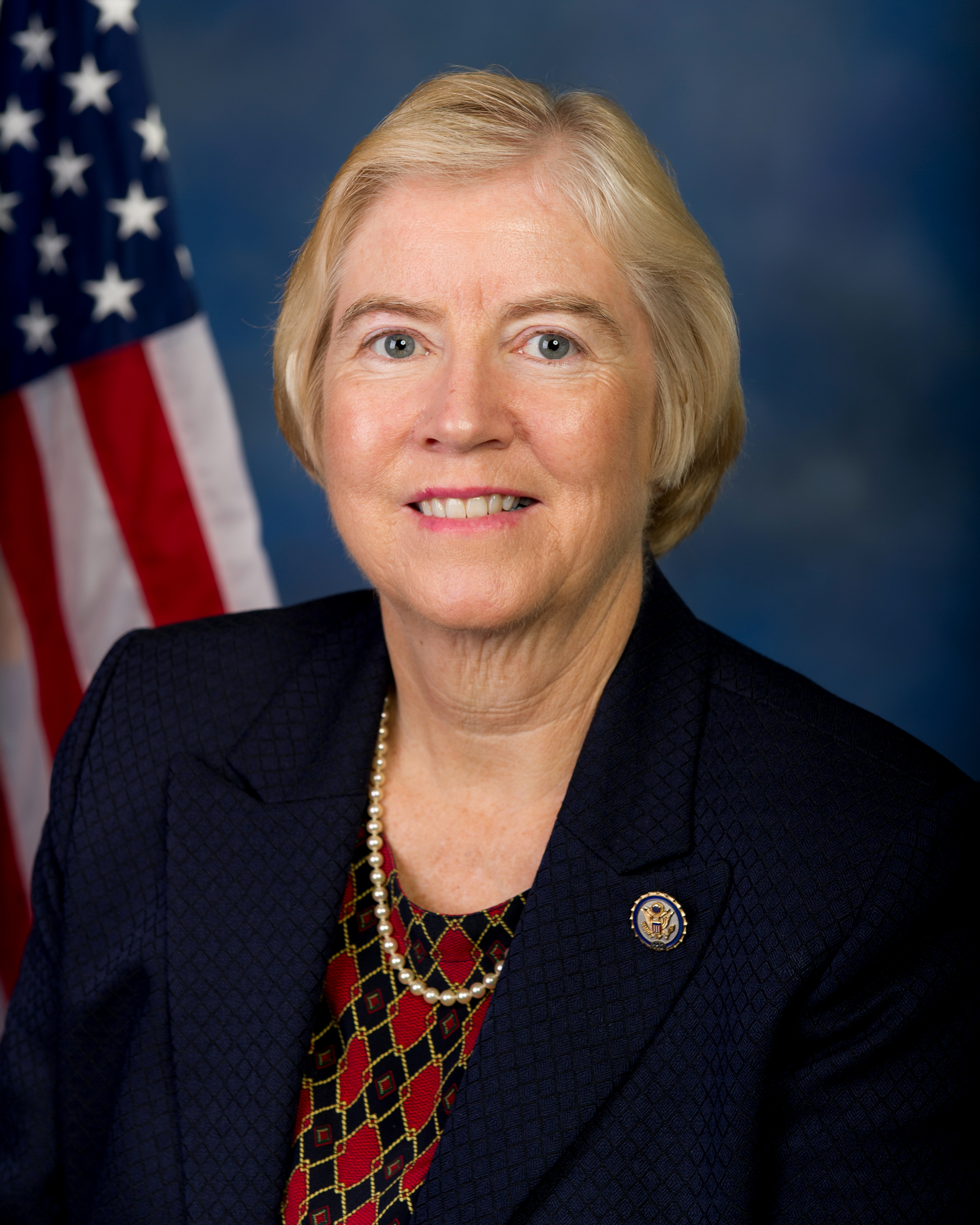
Candice Miller

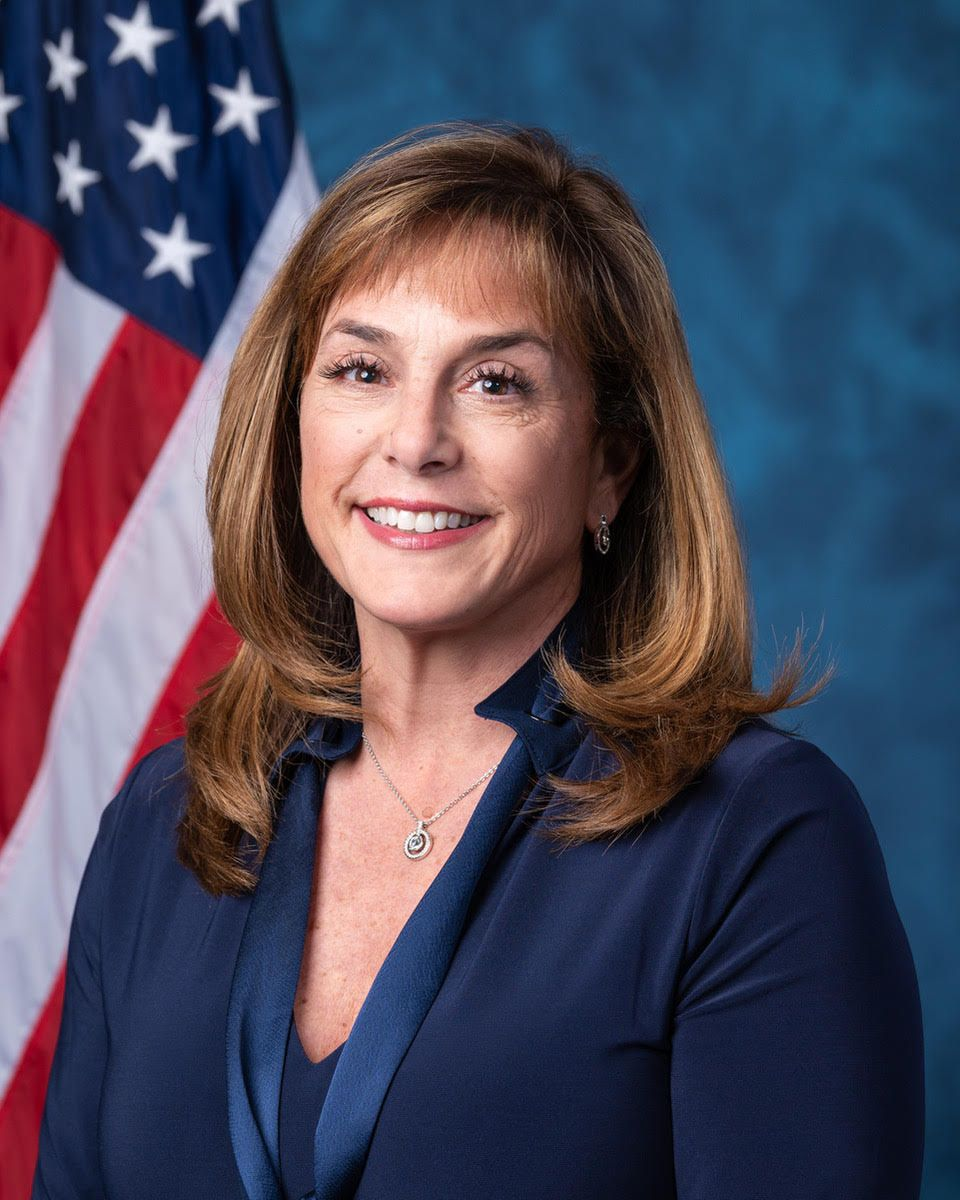
Lisa McClain

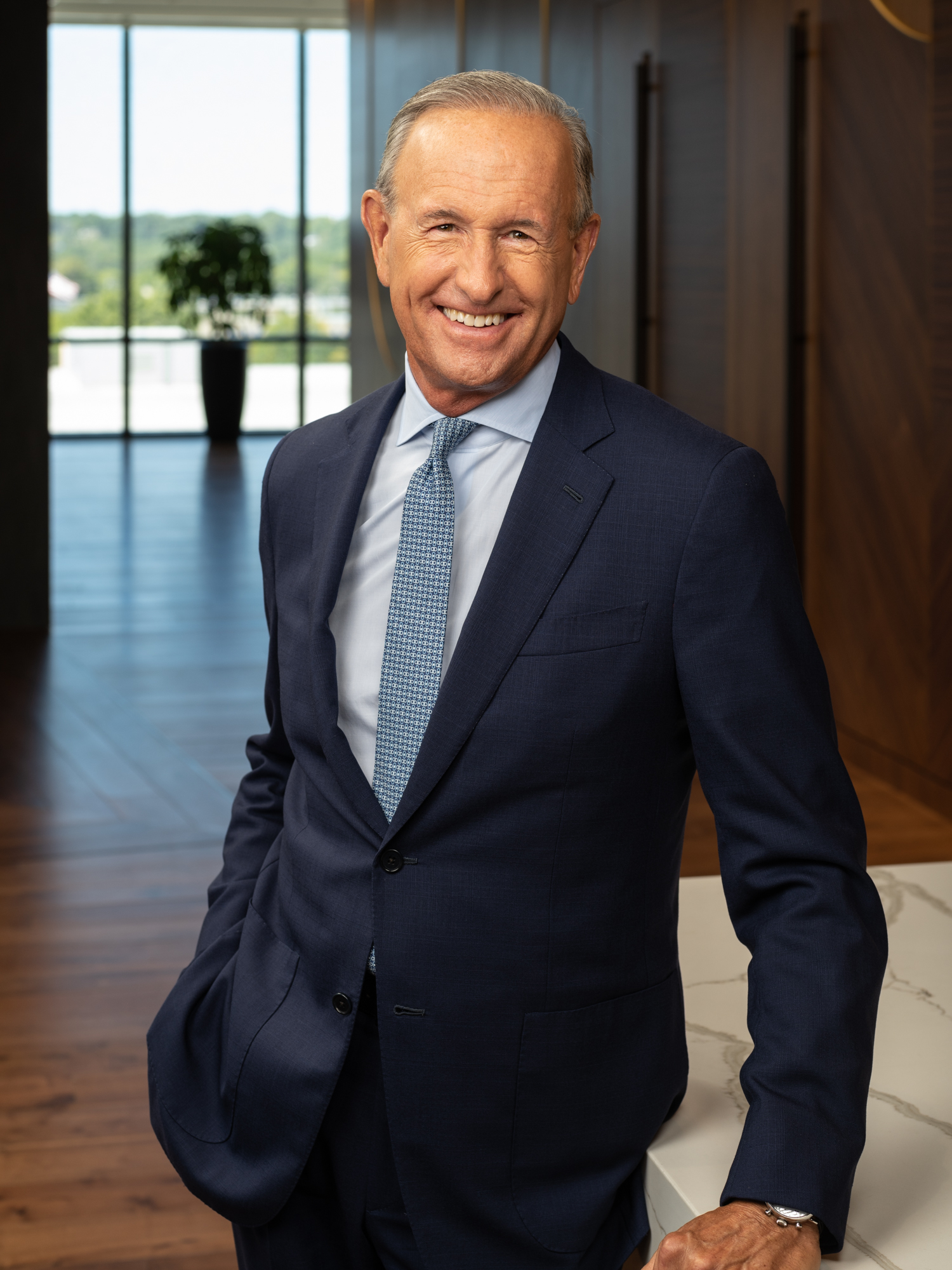
Dick DeVos

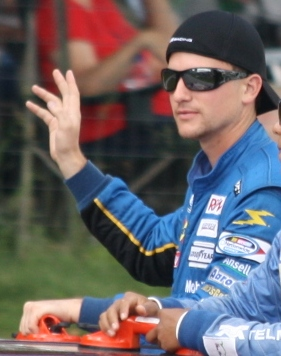
Robb Brent

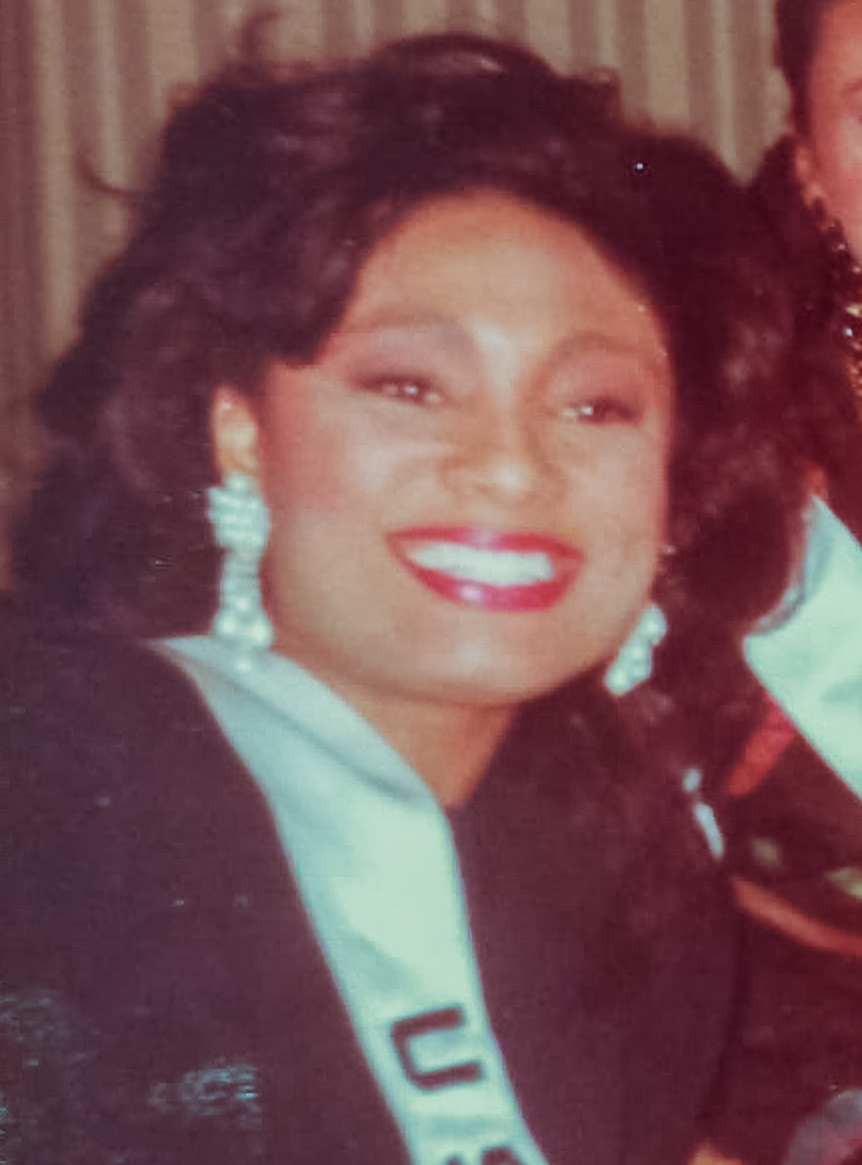
Carole Gist

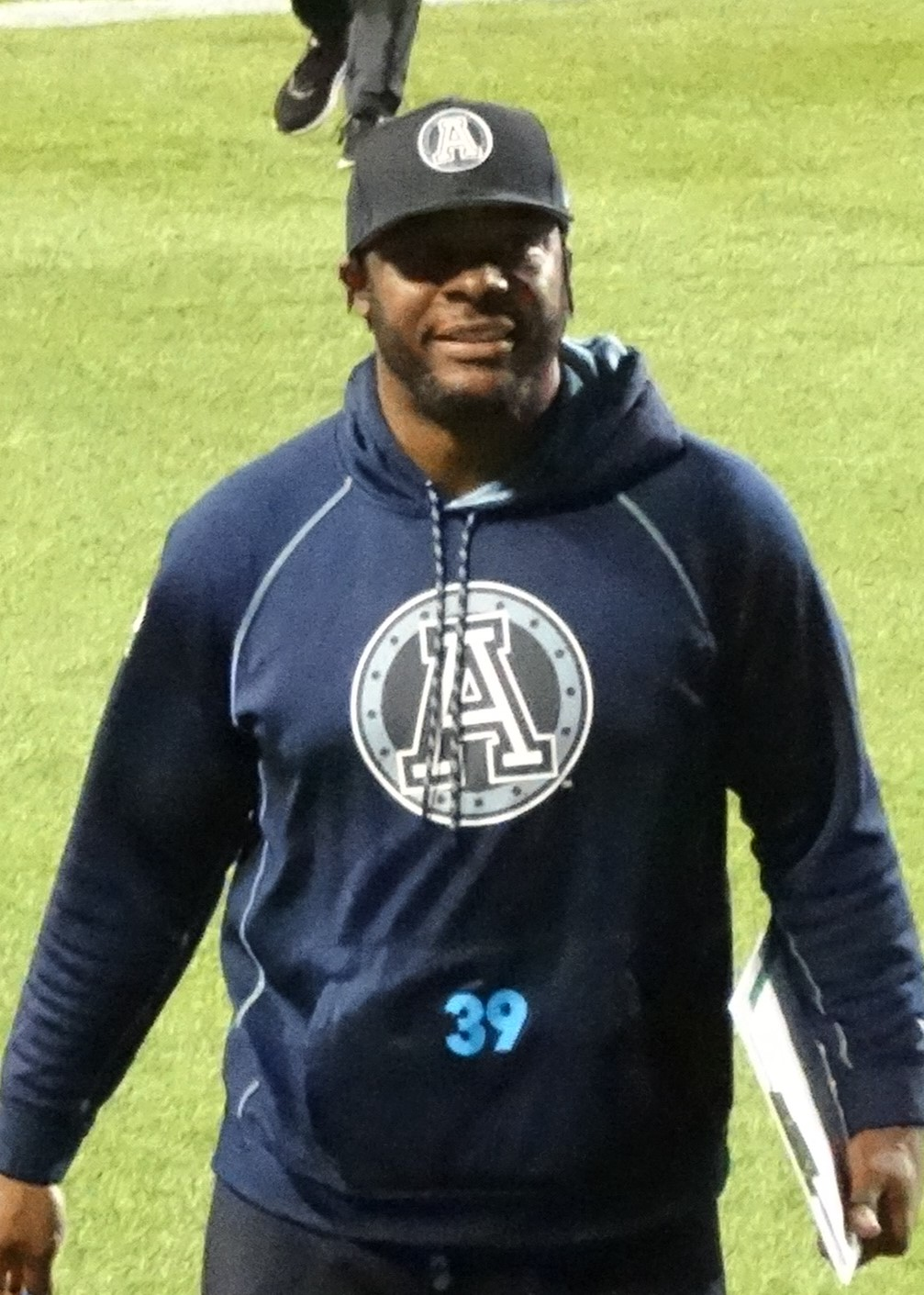
Charleston Hughes

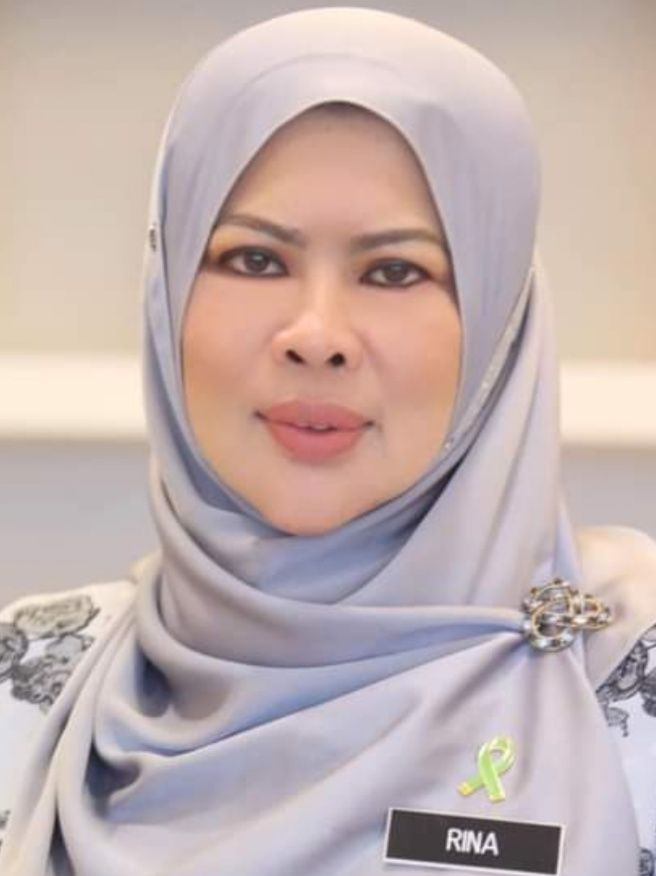
Rina Harun

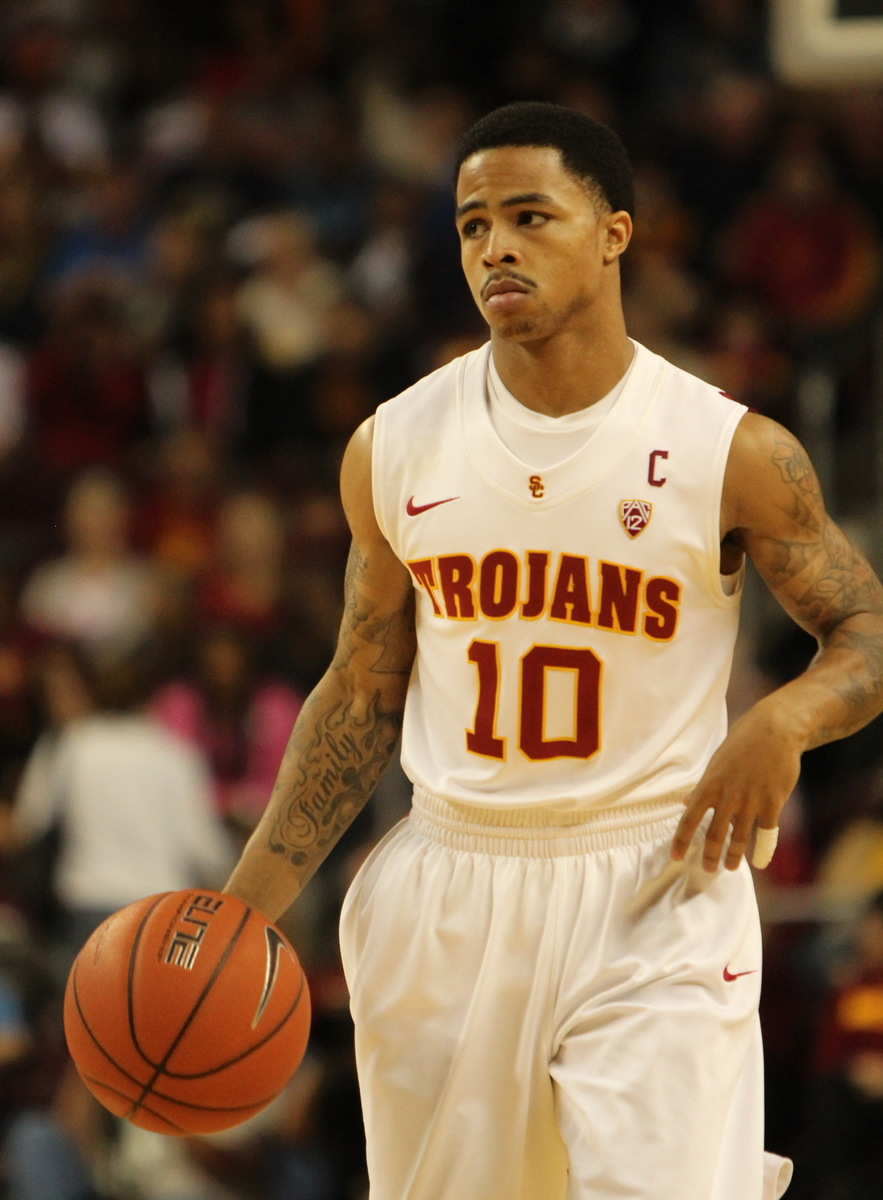
Maurice Jones
