= Durand Echeverria =

American historian (1913–2001)

- Born: February 26, 1913; Short Hills, New Jersey, U.S.
- Died: May 21, 2001 (aged 88); Wellfleet, Massachusetts, U.S.

Academic background
- Education: Princeton University (BS), PhD)

Academic work
- Discipline: History of ideas
- Institutions: Brown University; United States Navy; Wooster School

Durand Echeverria (February 26, 1913 – May 21, 2001) was an American historian, studying and writing about French writers and eighteenth-century ideas about democracy. He also translated several historically important French documents into English.

== Biography ==
Echeverria was born in Short Hills, New Jersey to Charles and Marie (Durand) Echeverria. He attended high school at South Kent School, and in the fall of 1931 matriculated at Princeton University. He was captain of Princeton's lightweight crew which won the Goldthwait Cup in 1933 and 1935, and competed for the Thames Challenge Cup at the 1933 Henley Royal Regatta. He graduated ΦΒΚ in 1935.

Echeverria taught at several boys schools, and served in the South Pacific for the United States Navy during World War II. After the war, he returned to Princeton for his PhD. He joined the faculty at Brown University in 1950 (becoming chair of the French faculty in 1964), and remained there until he retired in 1980. He was the recipient of two Fulbright Fellowships, a National Humanities Foundation grant, and a Guggenheim Grant. He also served as coach of the Brown crew for several seasons.

Between his 1980 retirement and his death in 2001, Echeverria lived with his wife in Wellfleet, Massachusetts, where he served the town as a commissioner and conservation activist.

== Bibliography ==
- Mirage in the West: A History of the French Image of American Society to 1815, 1957
- The Mapeou Revolution: A Study in the History of Libertarianism, France, 1770 - 1774, 1985
- The French Image of America. A chronological and subject Bibliography of French Books printed before 1816 relating to the British North American Colonies and the United States, 2 vols., 1994
- Liberty's impact : the world views 1776 : Brown University, July 4, 1976
- A history of Billingsgate, Wellfleet Historical Society, 1991
- New Travels in the United States of America. 1788 (translated by Mara Soceanu Varnos and Durand Echeverria, edited by Durand Echeverria) Belknap Press, 1964.
