= Bruce Beattie =

American cartoonist (born 1954)

Bruce Beattie is an American political cartoonist. His work was nationally syndicated in the United States and also appeared in magazine and books. He drew the syndicated Beattie Boulevard, which was published in several newspapers. He also served as the President of the National Cartoonists Society.

== Early life ==
Beattie was born in New York City. He graduated from Kent School in Kent, Connecticut in 1972 and the University of Pennsylvania.
