= Paul Cummins (basketball) =

Irish basketball player

- Born: 1984 (age 41–42); County Kildare
- Education: Lafayette College
- Occupation: Basketball Player

Paul Cummins (born 1984 in County Kildare, Ireland) is an Irish basketball player who played for the Ireland national basketball team.

== Biography ==
Cummins was born in County Kildare, Ireland in 1984. After he was named Junior Irish Player of the Year in 2001, he went to play basketball and study at the Ravenscroft School in North Carolina. Cummins then attended top ranked national powerhouse South Kent School on an athletic scholarship for one year (2003) and graduated as one of 6 basketball players to earn a further NCAA Division I scholarship from South Kent.

== Career ==
Cummins was an Irish senior men's international basketball player and had represented Ireland since he was 15 years old. While attending high-school in America, Cummins was named to the North Carolina All-State basketball and track teams. He led the Ravenscroft Ravens to state finals in both basketball and soccer, and was the NC state long-jump champion in 2003. At the South Kent School, Cummins joined a nationally ranked basketball team that had six players sign with NCAA Division-1 basketball programs, and one player, Dorell Wright, who made the jump directly to the NBA. Cummins was one a very small number of Irish-born male players to ever earn a basketball scholarship to an American NCAA Division I college (Lafayette College) under head Coach Fran O'Hanlon. As a four-year starter, he ranked fifth all-time in three-point field goals made at the school by his graduation in 2008, was named to the National Association of Basketball Coaches (NABC) Honor Court, and recorded several high-scoring performances including 20+ point games and a standout 17-point performance against Louisville in 2004. After graduating in 2008, Cummins played professionally in Europe. In 2009, he joined the City of Edinburgh Kings in Scotland, where he led the league in scoring (26 PPG), won the Scottish National Cup, and was named Scottish Cup Final MVP. He was also named National League Import Player of the Year. In the Scottish Universities league final, Cummins scored 54 points as Edinburgh defeated rivals Glasgow to win the title. He later played for the Ulster Elks and Belfast Star in the Irish Superleague, finishing as the top Irish scorer in 2011–2012 with an average of 20 PPG. Cummins retired in 2012 due to recurring knee injuries, but returned in 2015 to join Templeogue Basketball Club, winning both the Irish Superleague Cup (2016) and the Superleague title (2017) before retiring fully.

== Sport Dream Academy (SDA) ==
In 2013, Cummins founded the Sport Dream Academy (SDA) to support elite youth athletes in Ireland. The initiative focused on: • Developing advanced athletic skills • Creating a high-performance coaching environment • Offering exposure to international academic/sporting opportunities • Educating athletes and families on the U.S. college pathway Over its decade of operation, SDA worked with more than 600 student-athletes, helped over 30 athletes secure placements across U.S. college programs (NCAA D-I, D-II, D-III, JuCo, and Prep), and produced highlight footage with over 200,000 views. SDA was paused in 2025 due to increasing professional commitments.

== Academic and Professional Background ==
Cummins graduated from Lafayette College in 2008 with a double major in psychology and music. He holds an MSc in performance psychology from the University of Edinburgh (2009), an MBA from the University of Ulster (2010), and a PhD in psychology (2014), with a focus on leadership in sport and business. He has worked as a consultant to Olympic athletes, business leaders, and organizations in leadership development and safety culture. Cummins co-authored Leadership in Sport (2015) and Leadership in Sports Coaching (2018), and has published several academic papers on leadership and culture change in both sport coaching and business. Cummins is currently CEO of SeaChange Ltd, an Irish-based health and safety consultancy specializing in proactive risk management and safety culture transformation. In 2023, he led SeaChange through a successful acquisition by global insurance firm NFP, an Aon company, and continues to lead the company under NFP in Ireland.
