= Neal Peirce =

American columnist and journalist (1932–2019)

- Born: Neal Rippey Peirce; January 5, 1932; Philadelphia, Pennsylvania, U.S.
- Died: December 27, 2019 (aged 87); Washington, D.C., U.S.
- Education: Westtown School; South Kent School; Princeton University; Harvard University
- Occupation: Columnist
- Spouse: Barbara Sabina Mathilda von dem Bach-Zelewski
- Children: 3

Neal Rippey Peirce (January 5, 1932 – December 27, 2019) was an American journalist and columnist, and the author of several books about American politics. He was the political editor of the Congressional Quarterly from 1960 to 1969, and a co-founder and contributing editor of the National Journal from 1969 to 1997.

Mr. Peirce wrote a weekly column for The Washington Post Writers Group from 1978 to 2013. It was the first nationally syndicated column dedicated to covering cities and metro areas.

From 1986 to 2011, he worked with colleague Curtis Johnson to produce comprehensive "Peirce Reports" on conditions and potential improvements in 26 metro areas. Much of this work was reinforced by efforts of the Citistates Group, a network of American journalists he established in 1995 to similarly focus on reporting on towns and cities.

In 2014, Mr. Peirce launched Citiscope, a news service reporting on cities around the globe that eventually became part of the Thomson Reuters project, Place.

Neal Peirce died in Washington, D.C., from glioblastoma on December 27, 2019.

Nine months later, the Neal Peirce Foundation was established to honor Mr. Peirce's legacy. In recognition of the many years he spent on the road covering America's urban beat, the foundation's primary focus will be to award travel grants for journalists to get to cities and metro areas as he did–and report on solutions percolating there.

Mr. Peirce's large body of work is archived at the Howard Gotlieb Archival Research Center at Boston University.

== Selected works ==
- Peirce, Neal R. (1968). Electoral college. The People's President: The Electoral College in American History and the Direct‐Vote Alternative. New York: Simon and Schuster.
- Peirce, Neal R. (1972). Megastates of America: People, Politics, and Power in the Ten Great States. New York: W.W. Norton Company. ISBN 9780393054583. OCLC 472885901.
- Peirce, Neal R.; Hagstrom, Jerry (1983). The Book of America: Inside Fifty States Today. New York: W.W. Norton Company. ISBN 9780393016390. OCLC 317181631.
