= Schuyler Cammann =

American anthropologist (1912–1991)

- Born: Schuyler Van Rensselaer Cammann; February 2, 1912; New York City, New York, U.S.
- Died: September 9, 1991 (aged 79); Sugar Hill, New Hampshire, U.S.
- Education: St. Paul's School; Kent School; Yale University; Harvard University; Johns Hopkins University
- Occupations: Professor Emeritus; Department of Oriental Studies; Curator Emeritus of the University Museum
- Employer: University of Pennsylvania
- Spouses: Marcia de Forest Post; Mary Lyman Muir
- Children: 5

Schuyler Van Rensselaer Cammann (February 2, 1912, in New York City – September 9, 1991, in Sugar Hill, New Hampshire) was an anthropologist best known for work in Asia.

== Early life ==
Cammann was born on February 2, 1912, in New York City. He was the son of Herbert Schuyler Cammann (1884–1965) and Katharine Van Rensselaer Fairfax (1888–1978). His father, a great-grandson of Robert Fulton, inventor of the steamboat, was involved in real estate and insurance business he established in 1907. His sister, Katharine Schuyler Cammann, was married to Howard S. Lipson of Sugar Hill, New Hampshire.

His paternal grandparents were Hermann Henry Cammann (d. 1930), a former trustee of Columbia University and governor of New York Presbyterian Hospital, and Ella Crary Cammann. His maternal grandparents were Hamilton Rogers Fairfax, of the Fairfax family of Virginia, and Eleanor Cecilia (née Van Rensselaer) Fairfax of the Van Rensselaer family of New York. His grandmother was the granddaughter of Stephen Van Rensselaer III and Cornelia (née Paterson) Van Rensselaer. His maternal uncle was Hamilton Van Rensselaer Fairfax (1891–1955).

Cammann attended St. Paul's School on Long Island and Kent School in Kent, Connecticut, graduating in 1931. Camman later graduated from Yale University with a BA in 1935, Harvard University with an MA in 1941, and from Johns Hopkins University with a Ph.D. in 1949, where he studied under Owen Lattimore.

== Career ==
From 1935 to 1941 he taught English in the Yale-in-China program. During World War II, he served as a lieutenant in the United States Navy, stationed in Washington D.C., and later in Western China and Inner Mongolia.

In 1948, he joined the faculty of the Department of Oriental Studies at the University of Pennsylvania, which was founded by W. Norman Brown in 1931. He remained in the department until his retirement in 1982. From 1948 through 1955, he was the Associate Curator of the East Asian Collections for the University of Pennsylvania Museum. While at the museum, he was a member of excavation teams at Gordium (the capital city of ancient Phrygia in modern-day Turkey) and Kunduz (a city in northern Afghanistan). From 1951 until 1955, he was also a panel member for the television show What in the World?.

Cammann served as vice-president of the American Oriental Society and was the editor of the Journal of the American Oriental Society. He also served as president of the Philadelphia Anthropological Society and Oriental Club of Philadelphia, and was a fellow of the American Learned Societies and the American Anthropological Association.

=== Legacy ===
Modern representation of the Lo Shu square as a magic square

According to the History of Chinese Science and Culture Foundation, Cammann was

"a man of independent means who had no academic ambitions or need for a salary. His independence of 'the system' caused envy amongst several of his colleagues, who unlike himself were very ambitious for promotion. Even though he was a mild, polite, and gentle person of great friendliness, he experienced rebuffs and ostracism from several colleagues which were undeserved. He endured these affronts with great patience and tolerance."

Cammann was also very interested in Chinese magic squares, which the Foundation further described:

"One of Cammann's other great passions was for Chinese magic squares, concerning which he made detailed studies and published various articles. He was a pioneer in realizing the importance and significance of magic squares, and his work laid the ground work for their wider appreciation today amongst scholars, as well as enriching the field for the many studies of them by mathematicians which today are increasingly common."

Cammann wrote several articles exploring the history of magic squares in China and India.

== Personal life ==
In February 1943, Cammann was married to Marcia de Forest Post at St. John's Chapel of the Washington Cathedral. She was the daughter of Charles Addison Post, of Providence, Rhode Island, and Marcia de Forest Post of Hamilton, Bermuda, and granddaughter of Mrs. Isaac Judson Boothe of Providence. Together, they were the parents of five children: Francis Cammann, Stephen Van Rensselaer Cammann, Hamilton Cammann, Elizabeth Cammann, and William Cammann.

On December 27, 1980, he married Mary Lyman Muir in Philadelphia. Mary was the widow of John Brinley Muir, a stockbroker, and the daughter of John Lyman Cox, an engineer and inventor.

Cammann died in an auto accident on September 9, 1991, near his summer home in Sugar Hill, New Hampshire.
