= Jermaine Middleton =

American basketball player (born 1984)

No. 54 – Harlem Globetrotters
- Position: Center

Personal information
- Born: January 15, 1984 (age 42) Los Angeles, California, U.S.
- Listed height: 7 ft 4 in (2.24 m)
- Listed weight: 240 lb (109 kg)

Career information
- High school: Crenshaw High School; South Kent School
- College: Central Connecticut State University; Northwood University
- Playing career: 2011–2015

Jermaine "Stretch" Middleton (born January 15, 1984) was an American basketball player for the Harlem Globetrotters.

== Biography ==
The 7'4" Middleton was born in Los Angeles and started playing basketball as a Crenshaw High School junior. His friend Dorrell Wright convinced him to attend South Kent School for a postgraduate year. Jermaine attended Central Connecticut State University for two years (playing briefly in 2005-06), before transferring to the West Palm Beach, Florida campus of Northwood University (now part of Keiser University) for his final two years. In 2008 Northwood - with Middleton - made the final eight teams of the NAIA National Tournament.

Middleton played for Rochester and St. Joseph of the Premier Basketball League, and then in China. He began playing for the Globetrotters starting in the 2011-12 season, and continued through the 2014-15 season.

Middleton currently lives in San Antonio. He is in business with the Australian company SafeLace.
