= Sidney D. Kirkpatrick =

American novelist (1955–2025)

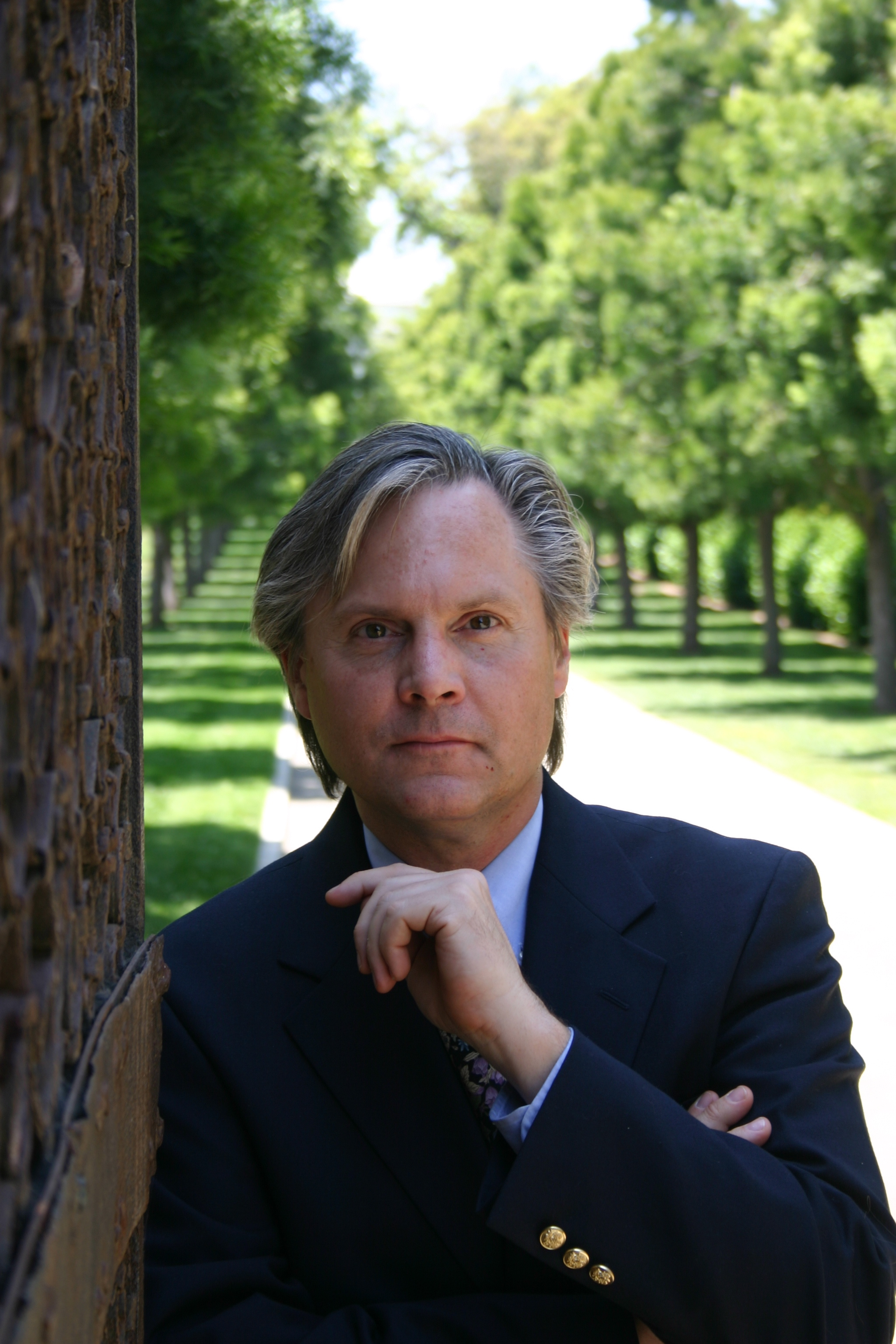

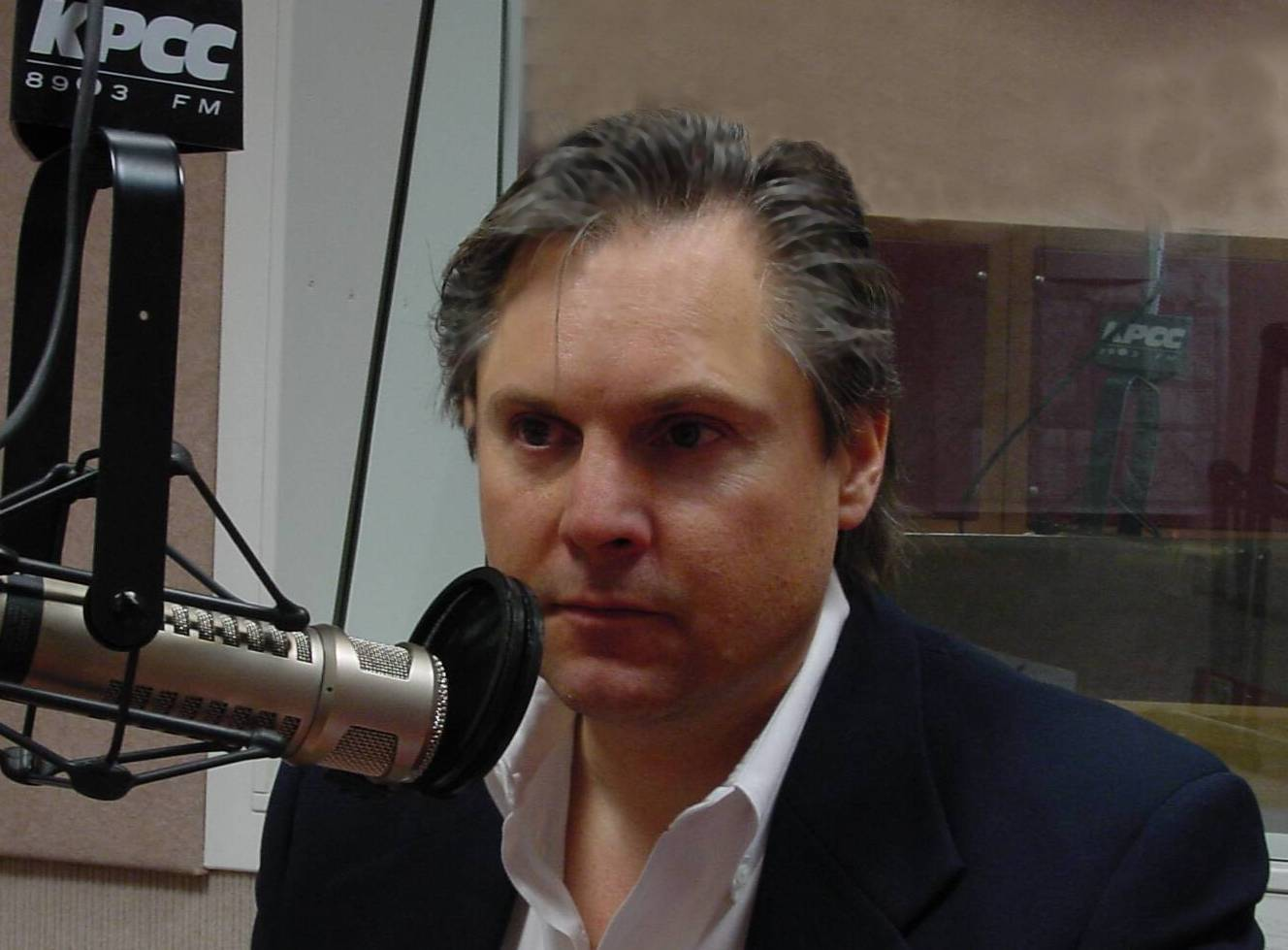

Sidney Dale Kirkpatrick III (October 4, 1955 – September 24, 2025) was an American documentary filmmaker and historical author and lecturer. He grew up in Stony Brook, Long Island and attended Kent School, Connecticut, Hampshire College, Massachusetts and New York University.

Kirkpatrick was husband to writer Nancy Kirkpatrick, the father of Washington Post digital photo editor Nick Kirkpatrick and attorney Alexander Kirkpatrick, and the stepfather of filmmaker and artist Mercedes Thurlbeck, and ai filmmaker, Vienna Thurlbeck. In his spare time he played squash, tennis, golf, collected grave rubbings and rang church bells. Sidney D. Kirkpatrick died in Duarte, California, on September 24, 2025, at the age of 69.

His documentaries include:

- My Father the President (1982), in which Ethel Derby, second daughter of President Theodore Roosevelt, describes her childhood.

His books include:

- A Cast of Killers (pub. 1986), ISBN 978-5-551-54135-6 a non-fiction account of Hollywood director King Vidor's private attempt to solve the William Desmond Taylor murder case.
- Turning the Tide: One Man Against the Medellin Cartel ISBN 978-0-451-40317-9 (with Peter Abrahams), (pub. 1991) a novelized account of a conflict which took place in the Bahamas between drug baron Carlos Lehder and an American professor Richard Novak's investigating hammerhead sharks there.
- Lords of Sipan (pub. 1992), ISBN 978-0-688-10396-5, a non-fiction account of the discovery, looting, and eventual recovery by Dr. Walter Alva of artifacts from the tombs in Sipan, Peru.
- Edgar Cayce: An American Prophet (pub. 2000) ISBN 978-1-57322-896-1, a biography of Edgar Cayce, the psychic.
- The Revenge of Thomas Eakins (pub. 2006), ISBN 978-0-300-10855-2 a biography of Thomas Eakins, the artist.
- Hitler's Holy Relics: A True Story of Nazi Plunder and the Race to Recover the Crown Jewels of the Holy Roman Empire (pub. 2010), ISBN 978-1-4165-9062-0, a true account of art historian-turned-Army sleuth Walter Horn's World War II investigation of Nazi plunder and Germanic mysticism.
- True Tales from the Edgar Cayce Archives (pub. 2015) ISBN 978-0876048269, Lives Touched and Lessons Learned from the Sleeping Prophet.

== Sources ==
- Edgarcaycebooks.com
