= Ilhi Synn =

President of Keimyung University
- In office 2008–Present

Personal details
- Education: Trinity College; Princeton University (Ph.D.)

Dr. Ilhi Synn is a South Korean academic, and the President of Keimyung University from 1988–2004 and 2008–present. As president, he transformed the school from a small college to a major university with over 24,000 students. In 2007, Dr. Synn received the National Award of Korea for Lifetime Achievement. In 2011, Dr. Synn was awarded the Commander's Cross of the Order of Merit of the Federal Republic of Germany for his commitment to enhance Korea-German relations.

== Early life ==
Synn initially studied in the United States at Kent School in Kent, Connecticut, graduating in 1958. He received his bachelor's degree from Trinity College in 1962 and was a fellow at University of Heidelberg in 1965. He received a Ph.D. in Germanic languages and literature from Princeton University in 1966 after completing a doctoral dissertation titled "The ironic Rebel in the early dramatic works of Ernst Barlach."

== Career ==
President Synn Ilhi, who has dedicated 60 years to the field of education, began his career after earning a Ph.D. in German literature from Princeton University in 1966. He served as a professor at various esteemed institutions, including the City University of New York and Yonsei University, before becoming the President of Keimyung University. During his tenure at Keimyung, he was instrumental in the development of the Seongseo Campus, demonstrating exceptional leadership in financial management and fundraising. His career is marked by a series of honors, including Poland's Grand Cross of the Order of Merit and the Republic of Korea's Order of Sport Merit, reflecting his significant contributions both in academia and as an active figure in international diplomacy and cultural exchange.
