= Keimyung University =

Private university in Daegu, South Korea

- Motto: 진리와 정의와 사랑의 나라를 위하여; For the Kingdom of Truth, Justice and Love
- Type: Private
- Established: 1954
- President: Prof. Synn, Ilhi
- Faculty: 1,884
- Students: 33,035
- Undergraduates: 30,292
- Postgraduates: 2,098
- Doctoral students: 608
- Location: Daegu, South Korea; 35°51′21″N 128°29′20″E
- Campus: Urban
- Mascot: The Flying Lion
- Website: www.kmu.ac.kr

Korean name
- Hangul: 계명대학교
- Hanja: 啓明大學校
- RR: Gyemyeong daehakgyo
- MR: Kyemyŏng taehakkyo

Keimyung University (Korean: 계명대학교), abbreviated as KMU or Keimyung, is a private university located in Daegu, the fourth largest city in South Korea. The university was founded in 1954 with the support of the leaders of the Northern Presbyterian Church of the U.S. as a Christian university. KMU is composed of three campuses in the city of Daegu, South Korea. They are named for their locations within the city; Daemyeong, which is near the downtown area; Seongseo, which is in the western part of the city; and Dongsan campus, which includes Dongsan Medical Center.

Keimyung University has relationships with more than 400 research and educational organizations worldwide as well as one of the largest communities of international professors in South Korea.

== History ==
Keimyung University originated from Keimyung Christian College, which was founded in 1954 by Reverend Edward Adams, an American missionary of the Northern Presbyterian Church of the U.S., and by Reverends Choi Jaehwa and Kang Ingu, two local Presbyterian Church leaders. The founding principle guiding their concerted efforts was to provide Koreans with higher education firmly anchored in Christianity. 1978, the year of Keimyung's elevation to the status of a university, marked the beginning of a new period of rapid development. In October 1980, the university acquired Dongsan Hospital, a local hospital with an 81-year history of service, and re-opened it as Keimyung University Medical Center. The development of Keimyung acquired a new dimension in the early 1980s when it added a new campus built on 550,000 pyeong (181,500 sq. meters) at Seongseo in Sindang-dong, Dalseo-gu, to its existing Daemyeong and Dongsan campuses.

== Rankings ==
- The K-Universities Global Excellence Ranking 2026 listed Keimyung University among the top 30 universities in two categories: education and student support.
- In 2025, the Center for World University Rankings ranked Keimyung University 1,250th out of 21,462 universities worldwide (top 5.9%) and 39th nationally.
- The SCImago Institution Rankings, which focuses on research institutions worldwide, ranked Keimyung University 42nd out of 102 South Korean universities, with a best quartile of Q1.
- According to the AD Scientific Index 2026, the university is ranked 56th in H-index, 40th in recent (last 5 years) H-index, 53rd in i10-index, 46th in recent (last 5 years) i10-index, 48th in citations, and 41st in recent (last 5 years) citations among 240 universities in South Korea.
- According to EduRank, Keimyung University is ranked 31st in South Korea and 1,728th globally. The university scored in the top 50% across 108 research topics.
- QS Top Universities ranked Keimyung University in 2025 #701–850 in QS WUR Ranking By Subject (Medicine).

== Academics ==
=== Undergraduate colleges ===
- College of Humanities and International Studies
- College of Education
- College of Business Administration
- College of Social Sciences
- Keimyung Adams College
- College of Natural Sciences
- College of Pharmacy
- College of Engineering
- College of Medicine
- College of Nursing
- Tabula Rasa College
- College of Music and Performing Arts
- College of Physical Education
- College of Fine Arts
- Artech College

=== Other programmes ===
- Korean Language Programme
- Korean Cultural Experience Programme
- Cross Cultural Awareness Programme
- Evening Programmes

=== Graduate schools ===
- Graduate School of Humanities and Social Sciences
- Graduate School of Natural Sciences
- Graduate School of Engineering
- Graduate School of Arts and Physical Education Science
- Graduate School of Medical Sciences
- Graduate School of Education
- Graduate School of Business
- Graduate School of Policy Studies
- United Graduate School of Theology
- United Graduate School of Arts
- Graduate School of Sport Industry
- Graduate School of Early Childhood Education
- Graduate School of Convergence Engineering

== University periodicals ==
- Acta Koreana, a peer-reviewed international journal of Korean Studies published in English by Academia Koreana. It is indexed in Thomson Reuters Arts and Humanities Citation Index (A&HCI), Elsevier's Scopus, EBSCO, and Korea Citation Index (KCI).
- Acta Via Serica, an international, multi-disciplinary, open-access journal published in English semi-annually. The journal is devoted to publishing new research within the arts, humanities, and social sciences concerning the Silk Road region and Central Asia.
- Keimyung Medical Journal, a biannual journal published by the School of Medicine. It publishes articles in all medical fields, including clinical research, basic medicine, and nursing.
- Keimyung Gazette.

== Facilities ==
=== Dormitory ===
Dormitory, Keimyung University

Housing	Number of rooms	Room type	Amenities
International House	80	30 m^{2} 1 room for single residents, larger married housing for couples	Bed, air conditioner, desk, closet, shoe rack, telephone, LAN connection, washroom, kitchen
General House	698	12.5 m^{2} 1 room for 2 persons	Bed, air conditioner, desk, closet, shoe rack, telephone, LAN connection, washroom

=== Dongsan Library ===
Dongsan Library, Keimyung University

The Dongsan Library, originally known as the Library of Keimyung Christian College, was established in July 1958. It was moved to its current site at the Seongseo Campus in March 1993 to facilitate expansion into a much larger facility that meets the needs of the information age. The Dongsan Library comprises three separate libraries: the main Dongsan Library at Seongseo Campus (seven stories above and two below ground level, with a total floor space of 6,538 pyeong), the second Dongsan Library at the Daemyung Dong Campus (seven stories above and two below ground level, with a total floor space of 5,392 pyeong), and the Medical Library at Dongsan Medical Center. Equipped with multi-media functions and an advanced information retrieval network, the Dongsan Library is now the focal point for research activities of faculty members as well as students. At present, the Dongsan Library houses around one and a half-million books, including specialized reference books, scientific journals, theses, ancient documents, microdata, CD-ROMs, and multimedia materials. The information or data owned by the Dongsan Library is made available for users around the world through the Keimyung University Library Integrated Information Management System (KIMS).

=== Dongsan Medical Center ===
Keimyung University Dongsan Medical Center consists of a medical school, Dongsan Hospital, and Gyeongju Dongsan Hospital. The history of the medical center began when American Presbyterian missionary Dr. Woodbridge O. Johnson arrived in Daegu on December 25, 1897. Two years later, in 1899, he turned a small cottage that used to be occupied by servants into what he named American Pharmacy, and began to distribute medicine to local people. This was the first modern medical service provided in Daegu. Subsequently, he ordered medicine from the US and began to offer treatment full-time, under the name Jaejungwon. In 1906, Jaejungwon was relocated to its current address in Dongsandong and was renamed Dongsan Hospital. In 1980, Keimyung University acquired Dongsan Hospital, renamed it Keimyung University Dongsan Medical Center, and established a medical school. Currently, the medical center has over 1000 patient beds and over 1700 employees. Due to the acquisition of the medical center, Keimyung University now regards its foundation to be in 1899.

=== Hengso Museum ===
Museum, Keimyung University

Since it was established on May 20, 1978, the Museum has devoted its efforts to studying the historical and cultural heritage of the local region with a special focus on Kaya, an ancient civilization that once flourished in Korea, but which left few records. Since then, the museum has accomplished much, including the excavation of the royal tombs of the Kaya Dynasty. Many Kaya artifacts uncovered through those efforts are on display in the Museum. Currently, a plan is underway to construct a new museum on a 9,900 square-meter site with a total floor space of 5,940 square meters. The opening is scheduled for May 2004, which will also mark the 50th anniversary of the university. The new museum building will feature a university history gallery, a Korean history gallery, a curatorial department, a conservation science laboratory, and other accommodations, including a museum shop and a café.

=== Edward Adams Hall of Worship and Praise (Adams Chapel) ===
Adams Chapel & Keimyung Hanhak-chon, Keimyung University

Located high on the flank of Kungsan Hill above the Seongseo Campus of Keimyung University, the Edward Adams Hall of Worship and Praise (known as the Adams Chapel) was built to honor the achievements of missionary Edward Adams, one of the founders of Keimyung University. The Adams Hall of Worship and Praise has three towers on the facade and a central domed tower. Those three towers in front (the two to the right of the center and one to the left) represent Keimyung University's educational precept, "truth", "justice", and "love", and the central dome represents "the Kingdom of God". The seven round columns in the main chapel represent the seven early churches in Asia referred to in the Book of Revelation in the New Testament. In the main chapel, there is a beautiful pipe organ built by the Karl Schuke company of Germany. On the front of the organ are three crowns, underneath each of which are arranged seven pipes. These represent the Holy Trinity, as well as the seven angels with seven trumpets, as recorded in the Book of Revelation. In addition, the Adams Chapel has over 160 stained glass windows of various sizes. The stained glass window depicts the twelve disciples of Christ, the three Wise Men, the Ten Commandments, the judgment of Solomon, and other stories from the Bible. The pipe organ, the stained glass, the chapel chairs, and the marble of the columns of the Adams Chapel were all made through the generous donation from the friendly Keimyung University.

=== International Lounge ===
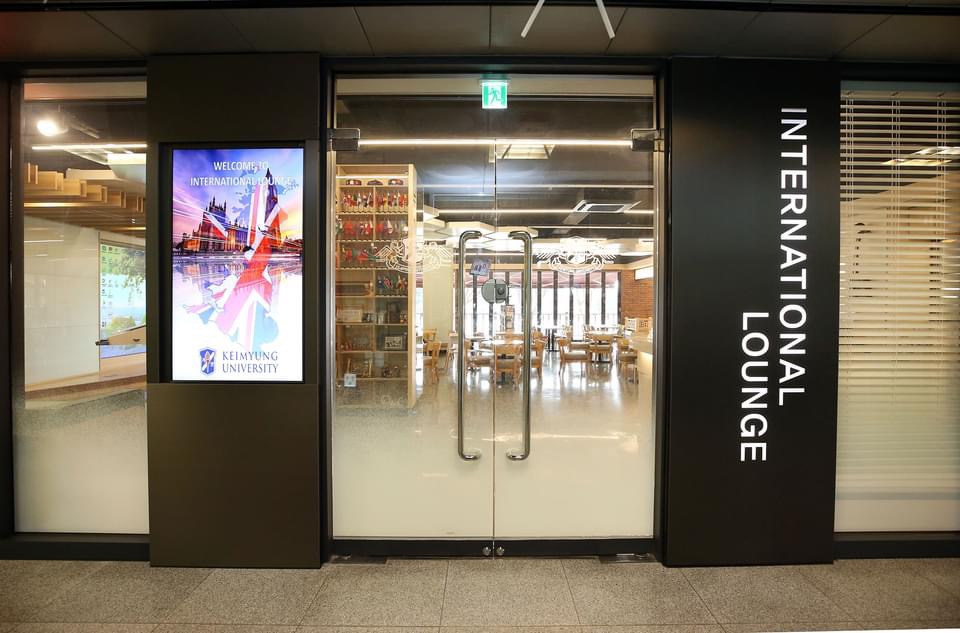
International Lounge, Keimyung University

The Keimyung University International Lounge (KMUIL) is a self-access learning center that opened in March 2005. It serves as a hub for promoting independent learning and meaningful engagement, fostering interactions among students, faculty, staff, and the wider community. The lounge offers a comprehensive range of language and cultural programs for both Korean and international students, as well as community outreach initiatives designed for local middle and high school students and senior citizens. In 2018, the space was expanded and remodeled to accommodate a greater number of visitors.

== Colleges ==
=== Keimyung Adams College ===
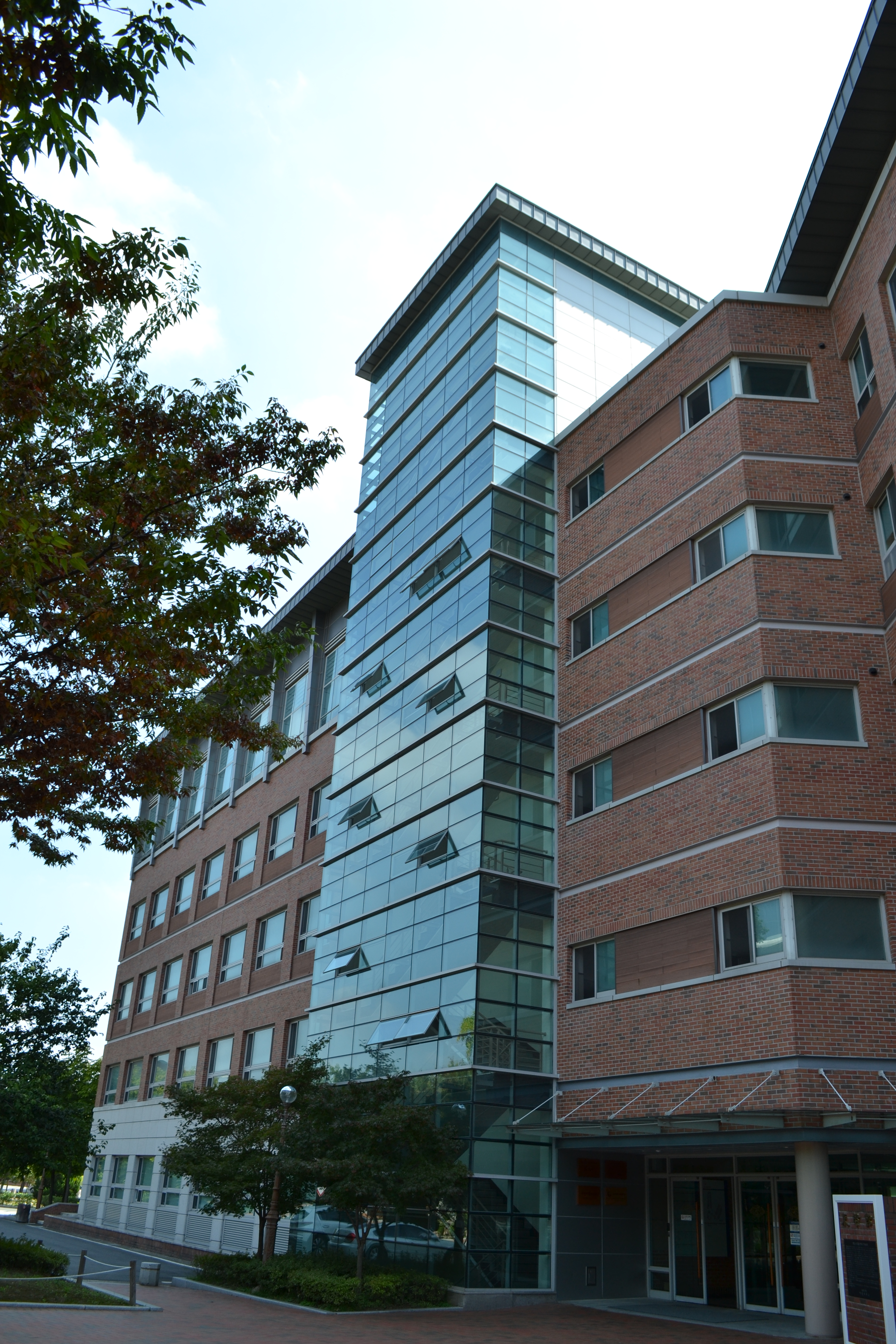
Keimyung Adams College (Dongyoung Hall)

Keimyung Adams College (KAC) is an honors college within Keimyung University. All of its courses are taught in English according to North American and European standards. Its student body includes Korean and international students. The college offers two bachelor's degrees: one in International Business and one in International Relations. Because the curriculum is based on North American and European standards, KAC is a popular school for exchange students. The college also supports international students seeking a dual degree from abroad. This program requires a four-semester residency. Graduation requirements for each of KAC's degree programs include a senior thesis, an international internship, and proficiency in Korean, English, and either Japanese or Mandarin.

=== College of Music and Performing Arts ===
Keimyung has offered programs in music since the 1960s and the College traces its lineage to the Department of Religious Music. Over time, course offerings were expanded to include theater, music production and dance. The college is divided into two faculties: Faculty of Music and Faculty of Performing Arts.

==== Keimyung-Chopin Music Academy ====
In 1999, Keimyung started an English-medium dual-degree program in partnership with Chopin University of Music in Warsaw, Poland. There are at least twelve professors from the Polish institution on site at Keimyung teaching the course. The professors select 30 students every year from among the prospective candidates through a process of highly competitive auditions and in-depth interviews. The cross-institution partnership has been reaffirmed by Polish leaders visiting South Korea, taking the time to travel to Daegu from Seoul.

Keimyung is the host site of the Asia Pacific International Chopin Piano Competition. It is supported by the Polish Embassy in South Korea.

=== College of Engineering ===
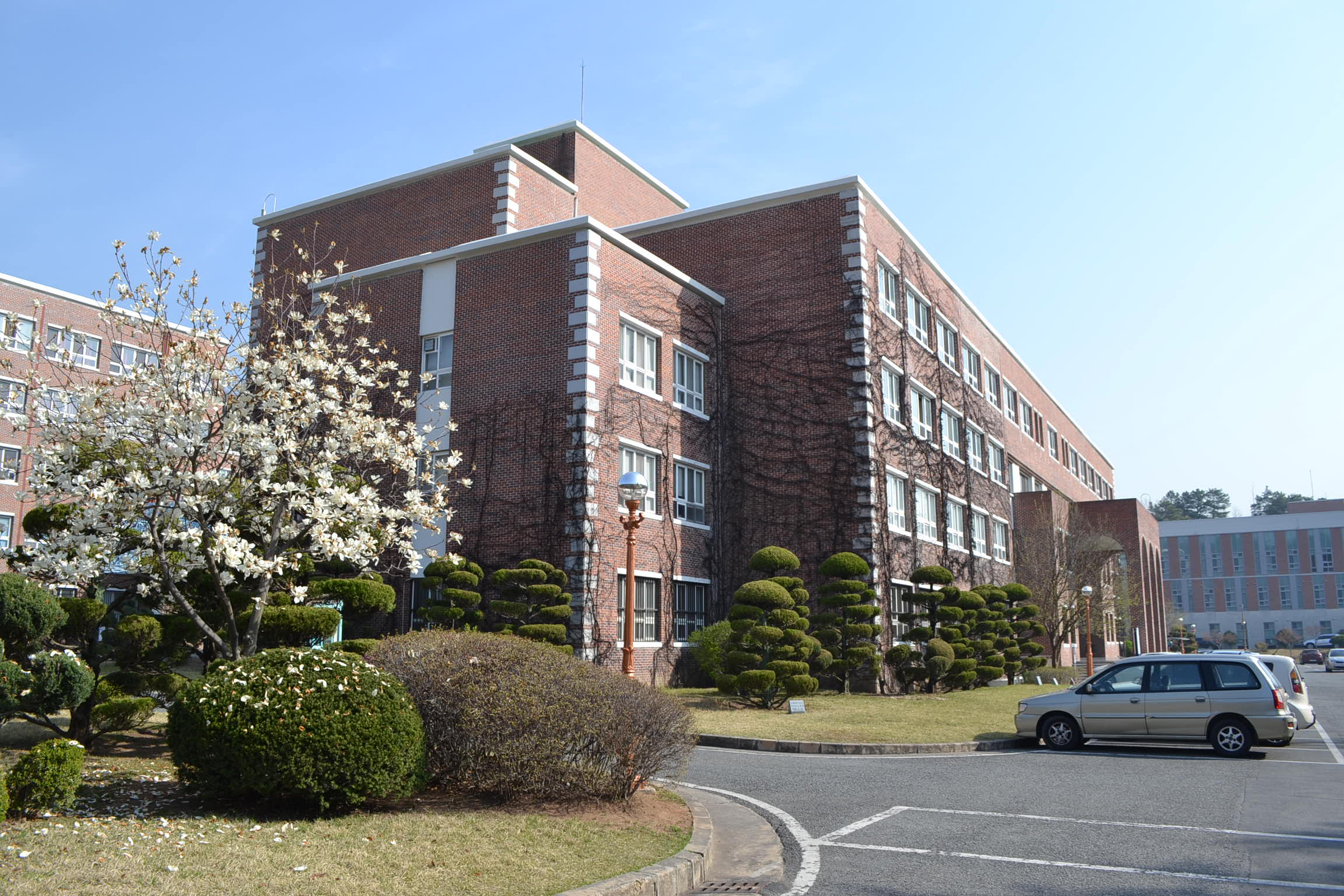
The 1st building of the College of Engineering

The six buildings used by the College of Engineering are located in the northeast of the Seongseo Campus. There are 25 multimedia classrooms in these buildings as well as 22 computer laboratories and 140 rooms for experimentation. Professors from Germany, Indonesia, Ghana, Ethiopia, USA, China, Mexico, Russia, Canada and New Zealand work in various departments of the college.

Departments

- Department of Advanced Materials Engineering
- Department of Architecture
- Department of Architectural Engineering
- Department of Automotive System Engineering
- Department of Chemical Engineering
- Department of Civil Engineering
- Department of Computer Engineering
- Department of Electronic Engineering
- Department of Electrical Energy Engineering
- Department of Game and Mobile Engineering
- Department of Industrial Engineering
- Department of Landscape Architecture
- Department of Mechanical Engineering
- Department of Robot Engineering
- Department of Transportation Engineering
- Department of Urban Planning

=== College of Education ===
The College of Education offers both academic and practical programs designed to train future secondary school teachers who can enhance the knowledge and abilities of younger generations. All graduates receive a second level teachers certificate on graduation in their major.

Departments

- Department of Education
- Department of Sino-Korean Literature Education
- Department of Early Childhood Education
- Department of English Education
- Department of Korean Language Education

=== Tabula Rasa College ===
The aim of the College of Liberal Arts is for students to study a wide range of liberal courses, foster foreign language ability necessary in this modern era of internationalization, and computer capability needed in the information age. The college also strives to cultivate a positive attitude and character for study. It runs Liberal Seminar and Academic Writing, Keimyung Spirit and Service, Understanding of Christianity, Communication English, Academic English, and Plan for Campus Life as mandatory liberal courses and subjects taken from the foreign language track and the information track, both general course subjects and electives offered on these tracks.

=== College of Physical Education ===
The College of Physical Education aims at nurturing international professionals in physical activity with a synthesis of knowledge, virtue, and physical ability. At present, over 650 undergraduate students and 150 graduate students are studying at the college, pursuing their career and scholastic goals. There are 18 faculty members and 14 student assistants in the college, providing students with the opportunity to develop their potential and obtain theoretical knowledge and practical experiences related to all areas of physical education. The college owns facilities for both educational research and physical education, including the Korean Taekwondo Center, the Center for Exercise Pedagogy, a sports science laboratory, a computer laboratory, a gymnasium, a weight training center, and an athletics track, as well as a variety of sports clubs for students.

Keimyung is a member of the Korea University Sports Federation (KUSF). Eligible students are afforded the opportunity to participate in inter-varsity national competitions.

Departments

- Department of Physical Education
- Department of Taekwondo
- Department of Sport Marketing

=== College of Social Sciences ===
College of Social Sciences was established in 1980. It currently hosts fourteen majors with students body over 4,000.

Departments

- Department of Economics and Commerce
- Department of Public Service
- Department of Communication
- Department of Consumer Information Studies
- Department of Sociology
- Department of Psychology
- Department of Library and Information Science
- Department of Social Welfare
- Department of Law
- Department of Police Administration

== People ==
Alumni

- Chang Hye-jin, a South Korean recurve archer. A two-time Olympic gold medalist, Chang was the Olympic champion in both the women's individual and women's team events at the 2016 Summer Olympics in Rio de Janeiro
- Min Hyo-rin, a South Korean actress, model, and singer
- Kang Min-ho better known by the stage name E Sens, is a South Korean rapper
- Kim Jae-yup, a retired South Korean judoka. Olympic gold medalist (1988)
- Lee Kyu-Hyung, Taekwondo 9th Dan grandmaster, former president of Kukkiwon. PhD from Keimyung University.

Former faculty members

- Hoesung Lee, a South Korean economist and current chair of the Intergovernmental Panel on Climate Change of the United Nations

Current professors

- Sergey Tarasov, Russian pianist. He was awarded 2nd prizes at the 1995 Ferruccio Busoni and Arthur Rubinstein competitions before winning the 1996 Sydney International Piano Competition

== See also ==
- History of Korea
- Education in South Korea
- List of colleges and universities in South Korea
- Daegu
- North Gyeongsang Province
