= Richardson W. Schell =

American Episcopal priest

Richardson W. Schell (born 1951 in Evansville, Illinois) is an Episcopal priest who has served as the headmaster of Kent School from 1981 until 2020. During his tenure, he was recognized for his leadership during the consolidation of separate boys and girls campuses into one fully coeducational school.

== Early life ==
Schell graduated from Kent School in 1969, Harvard College in 1973 and Yale Divinity School in 1976. He became an ordained Episcopal minister and worked in business upon graduation from Yale.

== Kent School ==
Schell joined the faculty of Kent School in 1980 as the chairman of the Theology Department and the school chaplain. He became headmaster of the school a year later. 1987–92, he led the consolidation of two separate boys and girls campuses into one. He also led multiple expansions of the school. In mid 2019 he announced his retirement as headmaster of Kent School. He officially left in June 2020 at the end of the 2019–20 school year.

== Family Guy ==
In 1999, Schell made national news for his part in attempting—under the banner of Proud Sponsors USA—to dissuade advertisers from running ads during Seth MacFarlane's show, Family Guy. Schell said he watched the show and claimed he started his push against advertisers specifically because of the content. What made the situation unusual was that MacFarlane was a class of '91 graduate of Kent, and MacFarlane's mother was also a former admissions officer for the school who had resigned earlier in the year due to her frustration over the situation.

MacFarlane believed that Schell started to advocate against the show due to his assertion that the Griffin family's last name was intentionally chosen to insult his administrative assistant, Elaine Griffin, and her family. MacFarlane said the name choice was just a coincidence because he wanted to use a common Irish last name for the family. Elaine Griffin had also been a close friend of his parents and he said he had no motive as to why he would want to make fun of her.

While Schell had some small-scale success getting advertisers to withdraw from the show, it ultimately did not impact Family Guy much in the long-term.
