= Tahj =

Tahj may refer to:

- Tahj Bell (born 1991), Bermudian footballer
- Tahj Chambers (born 2000), American football player
- Tahj Chandler (born 1994), American rapper and record producer, professionally known as Saba
- Tahj Eaddy (born 1996), American basketball player
- Tahj Jakins (born 1975), U.S. soccer player
- Tahj Miles, English actor
- Tahj Minniecon (born 1989) Australian soccer player
- Tahj Morgan (born 1996), American record producer and songwriter, professionally known as jetsonmade
- Tahj Mowry (born 1986), American actor, dancer, and singer
