= Flemming Gomme Graae =

American psychiatrist

- Born: December 1, 1948 (age 77); Copenhagen, Denmark
- Citizenship: American
- Scientific career
- Fields: Psychiatrist

Flemming Gomme Graae is an American psychiatrist and academician noted for his work on obsessive–compulsive disorder. He served as the Chief of Child Psychiatry at Westchester Medical Center and New York Medical College.

== Early life ==
Graae was born in Copenhagen, Denmark on December 1, 1948 and immigrated to the United States in 1952. He graduated from Kent School in 1967 and received a bachelor's degree from Rutgers University in 1971, a master's degree at Indiana University in 1973, and a M.D. from St. George's University in 1983.
