= Martin Russ =

Martin Faxon Russ was a United States Marine, author and college writing instructor.

== Life ==
Russ was born on February 14, 1931 in Newark, New Jersey. His parents were professional writers. He attended a private high school, South Kent School, and studied at St. Lawrence University. In his junior year he set aside university studies and enlisted in the US Marine Corps during the Korean War. Originally trained as a small arms repair technician, Russ requested and eventually received a transfer to a combat infantry unit.

After the Korean conflict he returned to civilian life and enrolled in the University of California - Berkeley. Eventually he became an associate professor of writing at what is now Carnegie-Mellon University. He died on December 6, 2010 in Oakville, California.

== Work ==
His first book, The Last Parallel, was a first-hand account (with changed names) of his service in the 1st Battalion of the 1st Marine Regiment of the 1st Marine Division during the Korean War. In his later work he returned to non-fiction military subjects with books dealing with World War II, Korea and the Vietnam war. Russ also published two novels and a memoir about the teaching profession.

== Recognition ==
The Last Parallel was a New York Times bestseller and a Book of the Month Club selection. J. D. Salinger called it “a very legitimate, sinewy, authentic war book”; The New York Herald Tribune called it “Top rank among soldiers’ war records of all time.” Kirkus Reviews opined that Russ was "a hugely gifted young writer", while noting that he was "in his jagged, haphazard way, wonderfully assassinating the King's English by any verbal somersaults he fancies." It was later optioned, but not produced, by film director Stanley Kubrick.

Of Russ' second book, Half Moon Haven, the New York Times commented: "With this book, Mr Russ proves himself a gifted novelist" and praised him as an "original and sensitive talent."

Breakout, which documented the Chosin River campaign of the Korean War, was described as an "outstanding history", "thoroughly researched" and "engrossing."

Written during the Vietnam War, Happy Hunting Ground included an account, told to Russ by a third party, of Australian soldiers threatening a Vietnamese woman with torture. Controversy ensued when it was claimed that the torture did not take place. Russ stated that he reported what he had been told by others and hadn't been present at the actual event.

Kirkus Reviews praised Showdown Semester for its "very sound and mostly amusing teaching tips" and found it "certainly worth a browse by anyone involved in this daunting profession."

== Publications ==
Fiction

- Half Moon Haven (1959)
- War Memorial (1967)

Non-fiction

- Happy Hunting Ground (1968)
- Line of Departure: Tarawa. Doubleday (1975). ISBN 978-0385096690
- Breakout: The Chosin Reservoir Campaign, Korea 1950. Penguin Books (2000). ISBN 978-0140292596

Memoirs

- The Last Parallel (1956) ISBN 978-0837167701
- Showdown Semester: Advice from a Writing Professor (1980) Crown Publishers, 1988 ISBN 978-0517542132
