= Frederick Herbert Sill =

American priest (1874–1952)

- Born: Frederick Herbert Sill; 1874; New York City, New York, US
- Died: July 17, 1952 (aged 77–78); Kent, Connecticut, US
- Education: Columbia University; General Theological Seminary
- Occupations: Priest; Headmaster
- Known for: Founder and headmaster of Kent School
- Term: 1906–1941

Frederick Herbert Sill (1874 – July 17, 1952) was an American Episcopalian priest and educator. He was the founder of Kent School, a private boarding school in Kent, Connecticut.

== Biography ==
Sill was born in New York City to Jane and Thomas Henry Sill, who was the vicar of St. Chrysostom's Chapel on West 39th Street in Manhattan. He graduated from Columbia University in 1894 and from General Theological Seminary in 1898, the same year he was ordained.

From 1898 to 1900, Sill served as a curate at Mount Calvary Church in Baltimore. In 1900, he became a monk of the Order of the Holy Cross and founded the Kent School on the Housatonic River in 1906. He promoted the philosophy of self-help and stewardship by asking students, many of whom scions of prominent families, to participating in housework or help with farming to raise produce for the school. It was also the first secondary school in the country to charge tuition on a sliding scale. Under his leadership, Kent was transformed into one of America's foremost boy's schools.

Sill was the coxswain of the Columbia varsity crew of 1895 that won the first Intercollegiate Rowing Association regatta at Poughkeepsie, New York, and he coached the crew team of Kent School, leading it to victory in regattas across New England.

On June 5, 1941, Sill retired from his post as headmaster after a paralytic stroke. He was affectionally called "Pater" by students of the school.

Sill died on July 17, 1952, at his home in Kent, Connecticut.
