= Taj Building, Nowshera =

Historic building in Nowshera

Taj Building
- تاج بلڈنگ
- Interactive map of Taj Building

General information
- Type: Historic building
- Architectural style: Oriental, Roman, Gothic and Islamic architectural elements
- Location: On the Grand Trunk Road in Nowshera, Khyber Pakhtunkhwa, Pakistan
- Coordinates: 34°00′21″N 71°59′15″E
- Completed: 1920s

Taj Building is a historic building located on the main Grand Trunk Road in Nowshera, Khyber Pakhtunkhwa, Pakistan. Formerly, it housed two film theaters where Pashto films used to premiere.

== History ==
The Taj Building was commissioned by Khan Bahadur Taj Muhammad Khan (OBE, MLC), a landlord and colonial-era contractor from Badrashi Village who commissioned several large residences, including the Rose Palace in Lahore and a private residence in New Delhi, which now houses the National Defence College. Ownership of the Nowshera property later passed to his son, Taj ul Mulk. After a prolonged legal dispute concerning tenancy, Taj ul Mulk regained possession of the building. The interior is currently maintained as a private museum and contains Persian carpets, antique furniture, and historical artifacts, including items associated with Field Marshal Alexander of Tunis, who served in the Nowshera Garrison in 1925.

On 26 September 2007, the NWFP Directorate of Archaeology designated the building as a protected monument under the Provincial Antiquities Act, 1997. Previously, it was protected under the Federal Antiquities Act of 1975 before being de-notified.

== Architecture ==
The building exhibits a combination of Roman, Gothic, and Oriental architectural influences. The façade features broad round arches, multiple decorated columns, and stucco ornamentation with floral and vine motifs. Access to the main compound is through an arched gateway built in jharokha-style, while the rear of the structure includes wooden balconies with decorative detailing.
