= Taj Ultimate =

Tournament information
- Sport: Ultimate (Frisbee)
- Location: Tajima, Japan
- Established: 2004
- Format: Round robin and knockout
- Most championships: Osaka Natto (4 titles)

Taj Ultimate (但馬アルティメット) is an annual mixed-gender Ultimate Frisbee tournament held in the Tajima region of Hyōgo Prefecture, Japan. Established in 2004 by participants in the JET Programme, the event was created to foster cross-cultural exchange and camaraderie between international residents and local Japanese players.

The tournament became a part of Japan's celebrated community-driven events, known for its festive atmosphere, BBQs, and social events as much as for its competition.

== Background ==
Taj Ultimate began as a small, friendly tournament hosted in the Kannabe Highlands, an area known for its skiing and outdoor sports. Early organizers were primarily English teachers placed in the Hyōgo region through the JET Programme. The event continues to emphasize inclusivity and sportsmanship.

The games are typically held on natural grass fields beside the IKI IKI Dome, also known as the Taj Dome.

== About the game ==
Ultimate (also known as Ultimate Frisbee) is a non-contact team sport played with a flying disc. It is played between two teams of seven players on a large rectangular field with endzones at each end, similar to American football.

The objective is to score points by completing a pass into the opposing team’s endzone. Players may not run with the disc, and must establish a pivot foot upon catching it. By passing the disc among teammates, the offensive team advances toward the endzone. If the disc is dropped, intercepted, or goes out of bounds, possession switches to the opposing team—this is called a "turnover".

Ultimate is known for its emphasis on fair play, referred to as the "Spirit of the Game". There are no referees, even at the highest levels of competition. Players are responsible for calling fouls and resolving disputes themselves, encouraging honesty and mutual respect on the field.

=== Format ===
Taj Ultimate is mixed-gender a tournament with teams required to field at least 3 players of each gender on the field at all times.Matches are played to a point cap of 13 or time cap of 45 minutes. Day 1 consists of pool play, while Day 2 hosts knockout matches.

== Tournament results by year ==
=== 2004 ===
The first Taj Ultimate took place on June 5–6, 2004 at the Taj Dome. It featured 8 teams, mostly composed of ALT players and their friends. Tokyo team The Small Axe won the championship.

=== 2005 ===
The 2005 tournament (July 9–10) saw the emergence of regional Japanese teams. The Kinki Trolls took first place.

=== 2006 ===
The third Taj Ultimate tournament was held from July 1–2, 2006. Osaka Natto became the first all-Japanese team to win the event.

=== 2007 ===
The fourth edition of the tournament took place on July 14–15, 2007, during a typhoon. Despite the severe weather, matches were completed using a modified schedule. Kuroshio, a Japanese team, won the championship.

=== 2008 ===
Held on July 12–13, 2008, the fifth Taj Ultimate tournament saw Nanman Dive secure the title after an undefeated run throughout the weekend.

=== 2009 ===
The sixth tournament was held from July 11–12, 2009. This year introduced a revised format, featuring pool play on the first day and knockout rounds on the second.

=== 2010 ===
The seventh edition took place on July 3–4, 2010. It was notable for including the first official Saturday BBQ and after-party, which became a beloved tradition in future tournaments.

== Community and culture ==
Taj Ultimate is renowned for its lively and inclusive atmosphere. The Saturday BBQ and dance party have become signature events, with players and spectators bonding over food, music, and games.Teams often dress in themed costumes, and sportsmanship awards are given special prominence.
