= Goldthwait Cup =

American university regatta award

The Vincent Bowditch Goldthwait Harvard Class of 1924 Memorial Trophy, better known as the Goldthwait Cup is awarded to the winner of the annual triangular regatta among the varsity lightweight eight-oared crews of Harvard, Princeton, and Yale. The competition has existed since 1918; however, the cup was first presented in 1926 and was made retroactive to 1922.

== History ==
The Goldthwait Cup is awarded to the winner of the annual triangular regatta among the varsity lightweight eight-oared crews of Harvard, Princeton, and Yale. The lightweight category is for 150-pound crews.

Vincent Bowditch Goldthwait Harvard Class of 1924 Memorial Trophy was first presented in 1926 by Henry Kimball Prince, Harvard class of 1924. Prince was the former captain of theHarvard lightweight . Prince named the cup in honor of his Harvard roommate, Vincent Bowditch Goldthwait, who had drowned in a motorboat accident. The cup was made retroactive to 1922, when Princeton won the race.

On the 50th anniversary of the cup in 1977, Harvard had won 29 times, Princeton had won 12 times, and Yale had won 9 times. As of 2026, Harvard has won 48 times, Princeton has won 28 times, and Yale has won 20 times. It was not award during World War II and during the COVID-19 pandemic.

Since 2006, yhe H-Y-P lightweight crews also compete for the Vogel Cup, awarded based upon total team performance. In the 72 years of Eastern Association of Rowing Colleges varsity lightweight competition between 1938 and 2013, the EARC championship has been won by Harvard, Yale or Princeton 54 times; on 43 of those occasions, the Goldthwait Cup victor was the EARC champion.

== Competitions ==
The following are the Goldthwait Cup competitions and rankings.

Year	Location	1st place	2nd place	3rd place	Vogel Cup winner	References
1918		Harvard				
1919		unknown				
1920		unknown				
1921		unknown				
1922	Housatonic River	Princeton	Yale	Harvard		
1923	Charles River	Yale	Harvard	Princeton		
1924	Lake Carnegie	Harvard	Yale	Princeton		
1925	Housatonic River	Harvard	Princeton	Yale		
1926	Charles River	Princeton	Harvard	Yale		
1927	Lake Carnegie	Harvard				
1928	Housatonic River	Princeton	Harvard	Yale		
1929	Charles River	Harvard	Yale			
1930	Housatonic River	Yale	Harvard	Princeton		
1931	Housatonic River	Yale	Harvard	Princeton		
1932	Charles River	Yale	Princeton	Harvard		
1933	Lake Carnegie	Princeton	Yale	Harvard		
1934	Housatonic River	Yale	Princeton	Harvard		
1935	Charles River	Princeton	Yale	Harvard		
1936	Lake Carnegie	Yale	Harvard	Princeton		
1937	Housatonic River	Yale	Harvard	Princeton		
1938	Charles River	Harvard	Yale	Princeton		
1939	Lake Carnegie	Harvard	Yale	Princeton		
1940	Housatonic River	Harvard	Yale	Princeton		
1941	Charles River	Harvard	Princeton	Yale		
1942	Lake Carnegie	Harvard	Princeton	Yale		
1943	no races					
1944	no races					
1945	no races					
1946	no races					
1947	Housatonic River	Harvard	Princeton	Yale		
1948	Charles River	Harvard	Yale	Princeton		
1949	Lake Carnegie	Princeton	Harvard	Yale		
1950	Housatonic River	Yale	Princeton	Harvard		
1951	Charles River	Yale	Harvard	Princeton		
1952	Lake Carnegie	Harvard	Yale	Princeton		
1953	Housatonic River	Princeton	Yale	Harvard		
1954	Charles River	Princeton	Harvard	Yale		
1955	Housatonic River	Princeton	Harvard	Yale		
1956	Lake Carnegie	Princeton	Harvard	Yale		
1957	Charles River	Princeton	Harvard	Yale		
1958	Housatonic River	Harvard	Yale	Princeton		
1959	Lake Carnegie	Harvard	Princeton	Yale		
1960	Charles River	Harvard	Princeton	Yale		
1961	Housatonic River	Harvard	Yale	Princeton		
1962	Lake Carnegie	Harvard	Princeton	Yale		
1963	Charles River	Harvard	Princeton	Yale		
1964	Housatonic River	Harvard	Princeton	Yale		
1965	Lake Carnegie	Harvard	Yale	Princeton		
1966	Charles River	Harvard	Princeton	Yale		
1967	Housatonic River	Harvard	Princeton	Yale		
1968	Lake Carnegie	Harvard	Princeton	Yale		
1969	Charles River	Harvard	Yale	Princeton		
1970	Housatonic River	Harvard	Yale	Princeton		
1971	Lake Carnegie	Harvard	Princeton	Yale		
1972	Charles River	Harvard	Princeton	Yale		
1973	Housatonic River	Princeton	Harvard	Yale		
1974	Lake Carnegie	Harvard	Princeton	Yale		
1975	Charles River	Harvard	Princeton	Yale		
1976	Housatonic River	Harvard	Yale	Princeton		
1977	Lake Carnegie	Harvard	Princeton	Yale		
1978	Charles River	Harvard	Princeton	Yale		
1979	Housatonic River	Yale	Harvard	Princeton		
1980	Lake Carnegie	Harvard	Princeton	Yale		
1981	Charles River	Princeton	Yale	Harvard		
1982	Housatonic River	Yale	Harvard	Princeton		
1983	Lake Carnegie	Princeton	Yale	Harvard		
1984	Charles River	Princeton	Yale	Harvard		
1985	Housatonic River	Princeton	Yale	Harvard		
1986	Lake Carnegie	Princeton	Yale	Harvard		
1987	Charles River	Yale	Princeton	Harvard		
1988	Housatonic River	Princeton	Harvard	Yale		
1989	Lake Carnegie	Harvard	Princeton	Yale		
1990	Charles River	Yale	Princeton	Harvard		
1991	Housatonic River	Yale	Harvard	Princeton		
1992	Lake Carnegie	Yale	Princeton	Harvard		
1993	Charles River	Harvard	Princeton	Yale		
1994	Housatonic River	Princeton	Yale	Harvard		
1995	Lake Carnegie	Princeton	Yale	Harvard		
1996	Charles River	Princeton	Harvard	Yale		
1997	Housatonic River	Harvard	Princeton	Yale		
1998	Lake Carnegie	Princeton	Yale	Harvard		
1999	Charles River	Princeton	Harvard	Yale		
2000	Housatonic River	Yale	Harvard	Princeton		
2001	Lake Carnegie	Yale	Harvard	Princeton		
2002	Charles River	Yale	Princeton	Harvard		
2003	Housatonic River	Harvard	Yale	Princeton		
2004	Lake Carnegie	Harvard	Yale	Princeton		
2005	Charles River	Harvard	Yale	Princeton		
2006	Housatonic River	Yale	Princeton	Harvard		
2007	Lake Carnegie	Harvard	Princeton	Yale		
2008	Charles River	Princeton	Yale	Harvard		
2009	Housatonic River	Princeton	Harvard	Yale		
2010	Lake Carnegie	Harvard	Princeton	Yale	Yale	
2011	Charles River	Harvard	Princeton	Yale	Yale	
2012	Housatonic River	Harvard	Princeton	Yale	Harvard	
2013	Lake Carnegie	Harvard	Yale	Princeton	Harvard	
2014	Charles River	Princeton	Yale	Harvard	Harvard	
2015	Housatonic River	Princeton	Yale	Harvard	Princeton	
2016	Lake Carnegie	Yale	Princeton	Harvard	Yale	
2017	Charles River	Harvard	Yale	Princeton	Harvard	
2018	Housatonic River	Princeton	Yale	Harvard	Princeton	
2019	Lake Carnegie	Princeton	Yale	Harvard	Yale	
2020	no races					
2021	no races					
2022	Lake Carnegie	Yale	Princeton	Harvard	Yale	
2023	Charles River	Princeton	Yale	Harvard	Princeton	
2024	Housatonic River	Harvard	Princeton	Yale	Harvard	
2025	Lake Carnegie	Harvard	Harvard	Princeton	Yale	
2026	Housatonic River	Harvard	Harvard	Princeton	Yale	
