= Jeffrey Ajluni =

American businessman

Jeffrey Ajluni is an American business executive in the professional sports, media operations and live entertainment industries. He is President & CEO of Fusion Sports & Entertainment, a Washington, DC based consulting firm specializing in sports and entertainment sponsorships and marketing consulting, as well as the curating and hosting of conferences and events that inform, educate and entertain. Jeff holds the unique distinction of having worked in the National Hockey League, Major League Baseball, National Football League, English Premier League, National Basketball Association and Major League Soccer. Ajluni served as Chief Partnerships Officer for the Major League Soccer club D.C. United in Washington, D.C. from September, 2021 through December, 2024. Ajluni led all partnership development and partner activation and services for the club, leading the partnerships team to unprecedented revenue growth in franchise history. Prior to joining DC United, he was senior vice president of strategic partnerships and business development for the US Travel Association in Washington, D.C. Ajluni oversaw all new business growth for the association, with a focus on developing partnerships and alliances that strategically benefit the U.S. travel industry.

Before his role with the US Travel Association, Ajluni was chief commercial officer for the Trust for the National Mall overseeing corporate partnerships, high net revenue development, marketing and events from August 2016 to February 2019.

He served as vice president and general manager for FOX Sports Media Group in Washington, D.C. Before his move to Washington, Ajluni served as Group Vice President, Corporate Partnerships & Community Development for the St. Louis Blues overseeing all corporate sales, service and partnerships, including broadcast and new media sales, and the further development of community partner programs, charitable efforts, and new business initiatives.

Ajluni was a full-time retained consultant for the Jacksonville Jaguars, working closely with Jaguars senior executives advising in the areas of revenue generation, staffing and recruiting, department structure, presentation materials, business prospecting, packaging and sponsorship category development.

Before joining the Jaguars, Ajluni was executive vice president, chief revenue officer for the Detroit Pistons and Palace Sports and Entertainment located in Auburn Hills, Michigan. He oversaw all revenue operations, including corporate partnerships, luxury and premium seating and ticketing.

Prior to joining the Detroit Pistons and Palace Sports & Entertainment, Ajluni spent 12 years with the Tampa Bay Buccaneers between January 2000 and December 2011, holding the positions of director, corporate partnerships, director, marketing & business development, director, marketing and new partner development. Ajluni managed all aspects of the Buccaneers corporate partnerships department, including sales, service and activation.

While with the Tampa Bay Buccaneers, between 2005 and 2008, Ajluni led global sponsorship development for Manchester United, located in Manchester, England (also owned by the Glazer family). Most notably, Ajluni worked closely with Bryan Glazer (Manchester United co-owner) to secure AIG Corporation as the club's shirt sponsor. It was the largest sponsorship deal in the history of team sports.

Before joining the Tampa Bay Buccaneers, Ajluni spent nine years with the Detroit Red Wings, Detroit Tigers and Olympia Entertainment of Detroit, Michigan, where he held a variety of positions. Ajluni is a native of Bloomfield Hills, Michigan, and a graduate of Northwood University in Midland, Michigan.
