= Tahj Bell =

Bermudian footballer (born 1991)

Personal information
- Full name: Tahj-Michael Bell
- Date of birth: May 12, 1991 (age 35)
- Place of birth: Bermuda
- Height: 6 ft 5 in (1.96 m)
- Position: Goalkeeper

Senior career*
Years	Team	Apps	(Gls)
2010–2011	Bermuda Hogges	15	(0)
2011–2013	Eccleshill United	2	(0)
2012	→ Bermuda Hogges (loan)	12	(0)
2013–2015	Hitchin Town	47	(0)
2014–2015	→ Aylesbury United (loan)	14	(0)
Total		90	(0)

International career
2011–2012	Bermuda	2	(0)
- * Club domestic league appearances and goals

Tahj-Michael Bell (born May 12, 1991) is a Bermudian former footballer who played as a goalkeeper.

== Club career ==
In August 2013, Bell made his debut for English non-league side Hitchin Town.

In late December 2014, Bell signed for Southern Division One Central side Aylesbury United on loan as cover for the injured Jack Sillitoe. Bell left Hitchin in summer 2015.

== International career ==
Bell made his debut for Bermuda in a November 2011 World Cup qualification match against Barbados and earned a total of two caps, representing his country in two FIFA World Cup qualification matches.

== Personal life ==
His sister is Cheyra Bell, who plays for Bermuda women's national football team. His late father Derek was also a football player.
