= Kent School =

Private school in Kent, Connecticut, US

Location
- 1 Macedonia Road; Kent, Connecticut 06757; United States; 41°43′37″N 73°28′56″W

Information
- Type: Private day and boarding school
- Motto: Temperantia, Fiducia, Constantia (Latin for 'Simplicity of Life, Self-Reliance, Directness of Purpose')
- Religious affiliation: Episcopal Church
- Established: 1906 (120 years ago)
- Founder: Frederick Herbert Sill
- CEEB code: 070330
- Head of school: Michael G. Hirschfeld
- Faculty: 75
- Grades: 9–12, PG
- Gender: Coeducational
- Enrollment: 520 (2023–24)
- Student to teacher ratio: 6:1
- Campus size: 1,200 acres (4.9 km^{2})
- Colors: Blue and gray
- Athletics conference: Founders League
- Nickname: Lions
- Endowment: $132 million (2023)
- Annual tuition: $73,450 boarding; $54,600 day (2023–24)
- Website: kent-school.edu

Kent School is a private college-preparatory day and boarding school in Kent, Connecticut. Founded in 1906, it is affiliated with the Episcopal Church. It educates around 520 boys and girls in grades 9–12.

Kent was one of the first schools to provide tuition discounts based on what a family could afford to pay. The school's list of notable alumni includes actor Treat Williams, artist Lana Del Rey, philosopher John Rawls, Secretary of State Cyrus Vance, and three winners of the Pulitzer Prize.

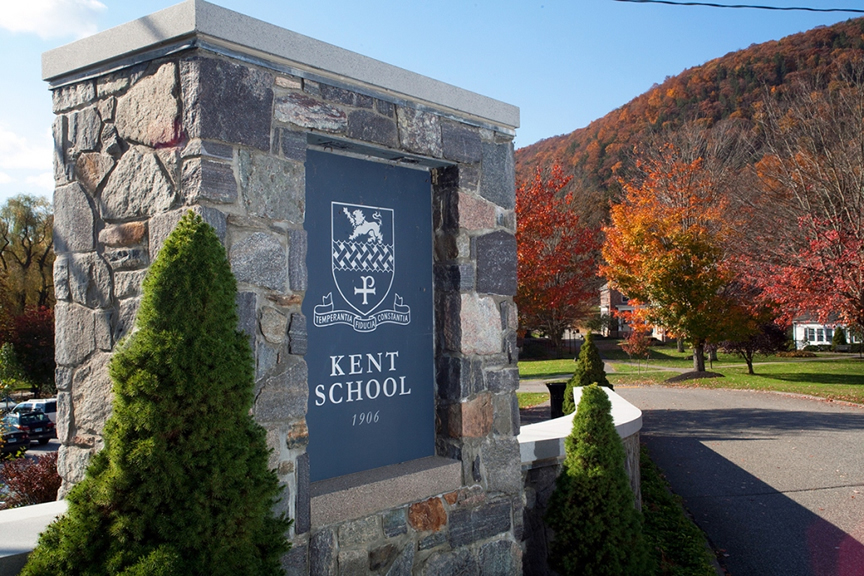
Entrance to Kent School

== History ==
=== Founding and ethos ===
Kent School was founded by Anglo-Catholic Episcopal priest Frederick Herbert Sill in 1906. It arrived at the tail end of the wave of British-style boarding schools set up at the turn of the twentieth century. Sill admired England and wanted to spread English influence within the United States. The school was originally associated with the Anglican Benedictine Order of the Holy Cross, but gained its independence from the Order in 1943.

Although Kent has occasionally been categorized within Saint Grottlesex, a group of boarding schools with traditionally upper-class student bodies, the school advertises itself as "an elite school, not a school for elites." Under Sill, Kent's culture was egalitarian for its day. When Kent was founded, the Gilded Age had ended, and the New York elite that Sill expected to fund his school were either unwilling or unable to bankroll another prep school.

Sill realized that many of his students would have to come "from families of moderate means who could not afford the tuition fees at the then established boarding schools of the [Episcopal] Church." To accommodate those families, he introduced a "sliding-scale tuition model," a forerunner of today's financial aid system, under which poor parents paid only what they could afford, and rich parents were asked to cover the difference. In 1927, the average tuition fee was $800, with parents contributing anything from $0 to $1,500. By contrast, that year, the St. Grottlesex schools all charged between $1,200 and $1,400.

Under Sill, all students, rich or poor, were required to help pay their own way by working on the school farm or doing school chores. Sill also discouraged rich students from flaunting their wealth, explaining that "we [do not] object to fur coats as such, but to see school boys sporting fur coats ... strikes us as rather ostentatious." Kent was also said to have been "more accommodating to those students who were drawn to creative pursuits than some of Kent's counterparts."

Despite its humble beginnings, Kent established a strong reputation. Due to Sill's desire to limit the student body to 300 students, the school's waitlist became "unmanageably long." To meet increasing demand, Sill established South Kent School in 1923. He retired in 1941 after a paralytic stroke, and died in 1952.

=== Development ===
Following Kent's 1943 disassociation from the Order of the Holy Cross, the school retained its broader affiliation with the Episcopal Church. However, in the 1950s, it began allowing Catholic students to attend Sunday Mass in town. Today, attendance at Kent's Episcopal Sunday chapel service is voluntary.

In 1954, Kent admitted its first African-American and Asian students. In addition, the school offered a scholarship to a black South African student in 1955. However, the apartheid-era South African government refused to grant the student a passport, causing an international incident.

The school established a coordinate girls' school in 1960, over a decade before the other St. Grottlesex schools adopted co-education. However, until 1992, girls occupied a separate campus nearly five miles away. When Kent began admitting girls, it dropped the sliding-scale tuition model and shifted to a more conventional financial aid system.

Under Richardson W. Schell '69, who was headmaster from 1981 to 2020, the percentage of international students at Kent increased roughly fourfold, doubling to 15.5% by 1996 and doubling again to 30% by 2015.

== Chapel ==
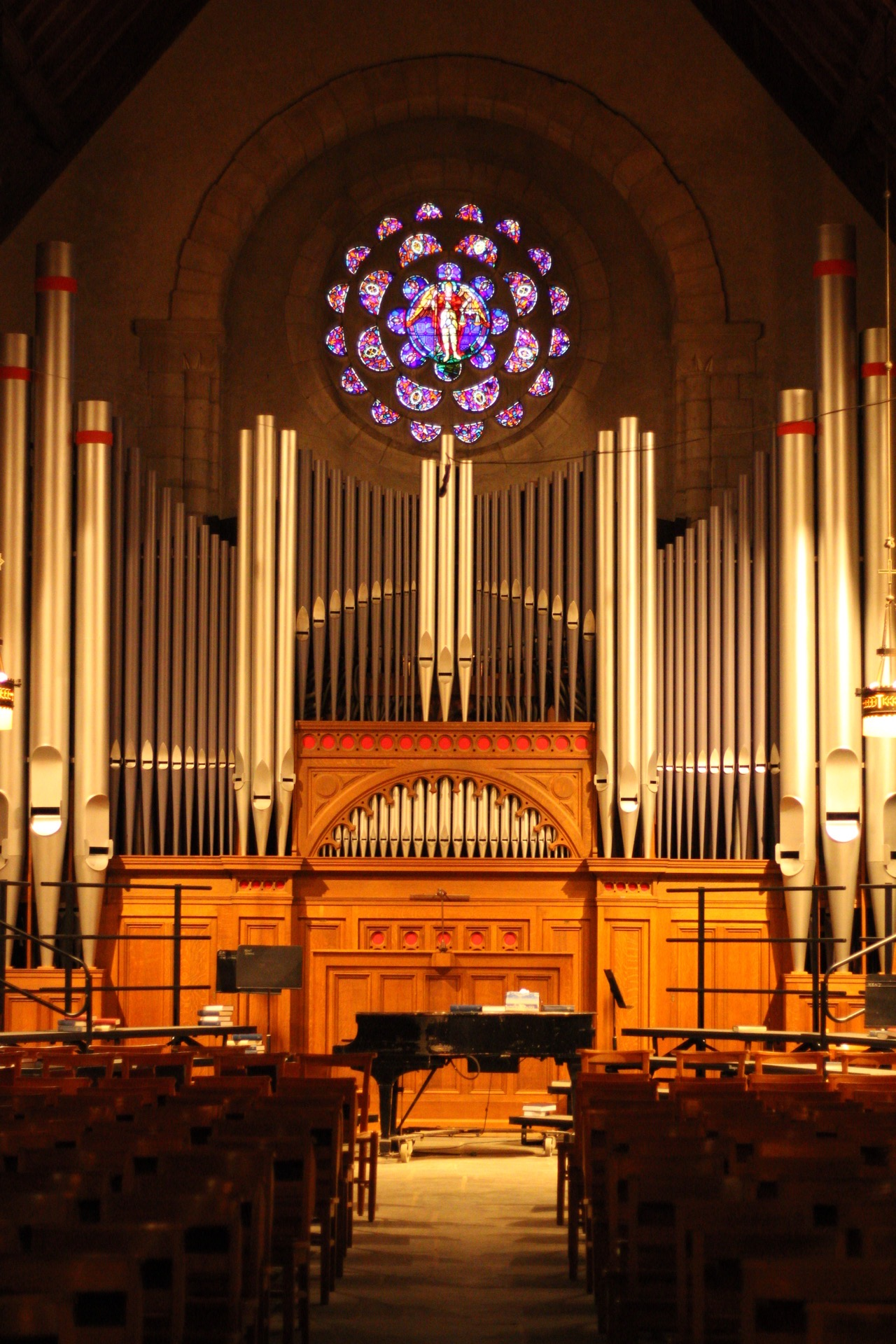
Rose window and organ in St. Joseph's Chapel

- St. Joseph's Chapel is a Romanesque church located in the center of campus. All school meetings and Formal Dinner, Tuesday, and Sunday chapel services are held here. The chapel was designed by architects, Roger Bullard, Arthur Harmon, and Philip Frohman.

== Controversies ==
Following the 1999 premiere of Seth MacFarlane (class of 1991) animated TV sitcom Family Guy, Kent headmaster Richardson Schell urged Fox Broadcasting Company's advertisers to cancel their advertising with the show. He called its brand of humor "obnoxious" and said that some of its jokes were racist. He also questioned whether the name of the show's dysfunctional Griffin family was a personal insult to his secretary, who was also named Griffin. Reportedly, Schell helped persuade companies like Coca-Cola, Philip Morris, KFC, and Sprint to withdraw their advertising from the show. MacFarlane's mother, who had worked at the school for 22 years, resigned in protest. In 2022 (two years after Schell's retirement) Kent awarded MacFarlane its alumni achievement award. To commemorate the occasion, the school commissioned a Kent student to create a video in which MacFarlane's friends and family recounted episodes from his childhood.

In 2017, The New York Times reported on a lawsuit alleging that Kent School failed to report alleged sexual misconduct by a faculty member toward a 15-year-old student in 1987 and 1988. The report came on the heels of The Boston Globe's "Spotlight" team revealing decades of alleged sexual abuse at numerous New England prep schools and alleged retaliation for student complaints. The reporters noted faculty alleged as abusers being relocated to different schools, including Kent.

== See also ==
- William G. Pollard § Fiftieth anniversary of Kent School
