= 2010–2013 Big East Conference realignment =

Expansion plan for the Big East Conference

The 2010–13 Big East Conference realignment refers to the Big East Conference dealing with several proposed and actual conference expansion and reduction plans among various NCAA conferences and institutions. Following on the 2005 NCAA conference realignment, resulting in the move of 23 teams across various conferences after an initial raid of three Big East teams, the Big East was severely impacted in the follow-up 2010–2014 NCAA conference realignment. Beginning in the 2010–11 academic year and continuing into 2013, 13 Big East schools announced their departure for other conferences and 13 other schools announced plans to join the conference (eight as all-sports members, and five for football only), but three of the latter group later backed out of their plans to join (one for all sports, and the other two for football only). Most notably, the seven schools that did not sponsor football in Division I FBS announced in December 2012 that they would leave as a group, which led to a formal split of the conference effective in July 2013.

In the end, the "Big East" name, history, and contract to the Big East Tournament location rights at Madison Square Garden were exchanged for almost the entire balance of over $110 million left in the NCAA National Tournament prize pool accumulated by the Big East in prior years. The FBS schools retained the charter of the original 1979–2012 Big East Conference, starting the 2013 academic year under the new name of American Athletic Conference, since changed to American Conference.

== Background ==
The Big East was founded in 1979 by seven universities in the Northeastern United States—Boston College (BC), Connecticut (UConn), Georgetown, Providence, St. John's, Seton Hall, and Syracuse. The seven founders consisted of five Catholic institutions, one private but secular university (Syracuse) and one public school (UConn). More significantly, only two of these schools—BC and Syracuse—then played football in the top-level Division I-A (now Division I FBS). Another Catholic school, Villanova, joined the following year, and Pittsburgh (Pitt), a quasi-public institution, joined in 1982. At the time of their respective arrivals in the Big East, both Villanova and Pitt had I-A football programs, but Villanova dropped football after the 1980 season, only reinstating the sport in 1985 at the Division III level and upgrading to Division I-AA (now Division I FCS) in 1987.

About a decade after the conference's founding, the members decided to launch a I-A football conference. To that end, the Big East added five schools with I-A programs—Miami as a full member, and Rutgers (which had turned down an invitation to become a charter member of the conference), Temple, Virginia Tech and West Virginia as football-only members. Big East football began play in 1991. In 1995, West Virginia and Rutgers became full members of the conference, and Notre Dame, with an independent football program, joined as a full but non-football member. These moves in the first half of the 1990s led to an unusual conference structure, in which only some of the full conference members played football in the Big East. Another of the 1991 football-only members, Virginia Tech, became a full member in 2000. Temple remained a football-only member until 2004, when it was voted out of the conference due to poor attendance figures, lack of playing success, and inadequate facilities. In the meantime, UConn announced in 1999 that it would upgrade its I-AA football program to I-A; its transition was completed in 2002, and it joined the Big East football conference in 2004.

Once the Big East established a I-A football conference, tensions between the "football" and "non-football" schools were a constant issue, though mostly under the surface. Miami in particular had been dissatisfied with the Big East as early as 1999. These tensions came to the surface in 2003, when the Atlantic Coast Conference (ACC) announced plans to expand from 9 to 12 members, which would allow that conference to hold a potentially lucrative football championship game. Miami, BC, and Syracuse were rumored to be the three schools under consideration; however, Syracuse men's basketball coach Jim Boeheim publicly opposed a move. The five other football schools—UConn, Pitt, Rutgers, Virginia Tech, and West Virginia—filed two lawsuits against the proposal, one against the ACC and the other against BC and Miami (Syracuse was not sued because its administration made no public comments on the situation). Due to political pressure applied by Virginia governor Mark Warner on the ACC and the University of Virginia, the ACC decided to invite Virginia Tech instead of Syracuse. Tech immediately accepted, and filed legal papers to remove itself as a plaintiff in the lawsuits. At the last minute, North Carolina State cast a "no" vote on BC, which meant that only Miami and Virginia Tech were invited to join. By mid-October 2003, NC State had reversed its original "no" vote on BC, and the ACC also extended an invitation to that school. Due to timing issues, BC was not able to join the ACC until 2005, a year after their former Big East brethren arrived in the ACC. These moves by the ACC became the trigger for a major wave of conference realignment.

The Big East responded to the loss of three football members by "raiding" Conference USA. Five members of that league were invited to join the Big East, with all five entering in 2005. Three of the new members were public schools with I-A football programs—Cincinnati, Louisville, and South Florida. The other two, DePaul and Marquette, were Catholic schools without varsity football programs.

The most recent, and largest, wave of realignment began in 2010, after both the Big Ten Conference and Pacific-10 Conference (now Pac-12) announced plans to expand to 12 members. These plans triggered a cascade of conference moves, with the Big East as one of the main centers of activity.

== First wave: TCU ==
On November 2, 2010, the Big East Conference officially announced its plans to expand from 8 to 10 football-playing schools. ESPN.com named TCU and UCF as leading candidates, along with the upgrade of current member Villanova's FCS football program to the FBS level. Other candidates included former Big East member and current football-only MAC member Temple and C-USA members Houston and Marshall.

On November 29, 2010, TCU officially announced that it would be joining the Big East Conference as an all-sports member starting in 2012. TCU was not subject to an exit fee from the Mountain West; under MWC bylaws at that time, a member was allowed to leave with no penalty if it registered its intention to leave with the conference office by September 1 of the calendar year before its departure.

The original idea that TCU should join the Big East reportedly came from a somewhat unexpected source—Pitt men's basketball coach Jamie Dixon. On September 18, Dixon, a former basketball player at TCU, attended the TCU–Baylor football game and suggested the idea to TCU athletic director Chris Del Conte. After the discussion, Dixon then went to Big East commissioner John Marinatto, which started the league's expansion talks. Rutgers AD Tim Pernetti pushed especially hard for the conference to invite TCU.

At first glance, the entry of TCU—a school located more than 750 miles (1100 km) from its nearest Big East neighbor in Louisville—would put huge financial pressure on both its athletic program and those of other Big East schools, specifically with regard to travel expenses for non-revenue sports. However, Marinatto pointed out to ESPN.com Big East reporter Brian Bennett that this issue was less serious than perceived. At the time, the Big East did not require that its member schools play other league schools in the regular season in sports based on individual competition (such as swimming and diving, track, golf, and tennis). Conference teams in those sports could compete against local schools or in meets in their region and still compete in the Big East tournament. The conference only required travel to other league schools in pure team sports (such as football, basketball, and soccer). By contrast, the MWC then (as now) had such a requirement in all sports. The distance between TCU and the other conference members is less than the 1,300 miles between football members South Florida and Syracuse and comparable to the distance between Louisville and Providence.

The TCU move put pressure on Villanova to decide whether to accept its invitation to join the Big East in football. Marinatto indicated that he expected word from Villanova no later than the school's next scheduled board meeting in April 2011, and preferred to see a decision by the end of 2010. If Villanova decided not to upgrade to FBS, UCF and Houston were seen at the time as leading candidates for future expansion.

== Loss of Pitt and Syracuse ==
At that time, speculation was rampant that the Big East might be able to attract a school from the Atlantic Coast Conference (ACC), which was in the midst of negotiating a new media deal. However, according to one industry source, "At that point when the Big East was intact, the only schools the Big East could have legitimately added that made sense were UCF, Maryland, and Boston College; and those schools wouldn't even return the Big East's calls. But the Big East couldn't add UCF because Judy Genshaft [president of UCF’s in-state rival South Florida] kept shooting down UCF." A source within the conference added that Genshaft's insistence on keeping UCF out was a major contributing factor to the instability that would soon plague the Big East.

The trigger for this instability proved to be the negotiations for a new television deal that took place in April 2011, when TCU was on board. Marinatto and the conference reached a nine-year, $1.4 billion deal and recommended that the conference presidents, who had the final say on the deal, accept it. The presidents reportedly voted 12–4 to accept in a preliminary vote. However, while the conference was going over the final details, the presidents had second thoughts upon learning of the deal that the Pac-12 had just reached with ESPN and Fox, reportedly worth $250 million annually, and in a second vote turned down the deal 16–0. In May 2012, one Big East source told Brett McMurphy, then of CBSSports.com, that turning down the deal "was the stupidest decision ever made in college athletics. To have the equity of ESPN as your brand and the stability that would have gone with it." Another source added, "If the TV deal was accepted and UCF had been added, who knows if Pitt and Syracuse ever leave. Everyone left because of stability and right there was your stability with that TV deal."

Five months after the aborted media deal, McMurphy reported on September 16, 2011 (coincidentally, the same day that Conference founder Dave Gavitt died) that two of the conference's mainstays—the University of Pittsburgh and Syracuse University—would leave for the ACC. He recalled in May 2012 that he tried to contact Marinatto for a quote, but could not reach him, and found out several weeks later that Marinatto first learned of the two schools' plans from McMurphy's report. In fact, no one at the conference office or at any other Big East school knew that Pitt and Syracuse were leaving until this report, and Jim Boeheim (who at the time had been involved with Syracuse athletics for over 50 years) did not know of Syracuse's intentions until they were announced as a new ACC member.

On September 18, Pitt and Syracuse submitted formal applications to join the ACC, which were accepted later that day.

== First major membership turnover ==
Marinatto's next attempt to stabilize the league was a dramatic increase in the conference exit fee. On October 2, he recommended to the conference presidents that the exit fee be increased from $5 million to a minimum of $12 million, and as much as $15 million. The presidents voted against Marinatto's proposal.

Days after the presidents rejected the increased exit fees, TCU reversed its acceptance on October 10 and decided not to join the Big East. Instead, TCU announced that it would accept a new invitation from the Big 12 Conference. The Big 12 is home to several former conference rivals of TCU from the Southwest Conference, which dissolved in 1996.

On October 28, 2011, West Virginia University was officially invited to join the Big 12 and accepted the same day. They aimed to become a full member effective July 1, 2012. To enforce this move, the university filed a lawsuit against the Big East, and blamed Marinatto for the departures of Pittsburgh, Syracuse, and TCU. The Big East also filed a counter-suit against WVU to enforce the 27-month waiting period. By contrast, Pitt and Syracuse made no attempt at that time to overturn the waiting period.

The Big East invited nine schools – four (University of Houston, Southern Methodist University, University of Memphis, University of Central Florida) as full members, five as football-only members (United States Air Force Academy, United States Naval Academy, Boise State University, Brigham Young University, San Diego State University). To further stabilize the conference, members unanimously agreed to double the exit fee from $5 million to $10 million, contingent on any one accepted invitation. Of the schools, all four invited to full membership accepted, as well as football-only Boise State, Navy, and San Diego State. BYU and the Big East were unable to come to terms; the conference insisted that BYU relinquish its TV rights for its home games as a condition of membership, and BYU was unwilling to do so.

On February 10, 2012, the Charleston Daily Mail reported that the Big East and WVU had settled their legal dispute. The settlement, which allowed WVU to join the Big 12 in July 2012, was officially made public on February 14. Under its terms, WVU would pay $11 million and the Big 12 $9 million. These amounts include the Big East's $5 million exit fee, half of which WVU had previously paid. By comparison, the Big 12 received a total of $24.8 million from Missouri and Texas A&M, which by that time had announced their departure for the Southeastern Conference.

== The return of Temple ==
With WVU's departure, the Big East was temporarily left with only seven football programs. In an attempt to fill the Mountaineers' place, the conference first sought to have Boise State football join a year early. However, the school turned the offer down because it would have been subject to steep financial penalties from both the Mountain West and WAC had the football team left for the Big East in 2012. The conference then entered into talks with Temple, which had been a football member of the Big East from 1991 until being expelled after the 2004 season. At the time of their expulsion, the Owls were one of the worst programs in major-college football, but had since achieved respectability in the Mid-American Conference, appearing in two bowl games in the previous three seasons.

On March 7, the Big East and Temple announced that the Owls would return to Big East football in 2012; the school would become a full conference member in 2013. Temple paid exit fees of $6 million to the MAC and $1 million to its then-current all-sports conference, the Atlantic 10, with the Big East picking up an undisclosed portion via future revenue distributions. Temple's move caused increased speculation that their local rival Villanova could soon choose to upgrade to FBS and join the Big East football conference. Villanova had been contemplating such a move in 2011 before the Big East backed out. During the discussions between the conference and Temple, Villanova was reportedly given $1 million earmarked toward upgrading its football facilities, with a possible $2 million more available if it chose to join for football. In addition, the Big East football entry fee, a reported $2.5 million, would be waived if Villanova joined within the next three years.

== Further instability ==
The next significant event in the Big East was Marinatto's forced resignation on May 7, 2012. According to one league source, "He was the human pin cushion. Nobody in the world could have made this work. Look at the things he was dealt." McMurphy remarked that Marinatto "was set up to fail by the league's presidents because they handcuffed his ability to make any relevant changes."

Two days later, ESPN's Andy Katz reported that Louisville AD Tom Jurich told the Big East board of directors that it was looking to join either the Big 12 or ACC. Katz added that although Connecticut was on public record as wishing to stay in the conference, sources within the school said privately that they wanted to be in the ACC with Notre Dame. As for Notre Dame, it announced a major shift away from the Big East on September 12, 2012, formally joining the ACC as a conference member in all sports but football starting as early as 2014. While Notre Dame's football program retained nominal independence, the agreement included a commitment by the Fighting Irish to field five games per year against ACC opponents in future schedules. On March 12, 2013, Notre Dame and the Big East reached agreement on the Irish departure date of July 1, 2013.

Arguing that by allowing West Virginia to purchase their early departure the Big East had effectively negated the 27-month waiting period for departing schools, Pittsburgh sued the conference demanding its own early departure. On July 16, 2012, Syracuse and the Big East announced that they had reached an agreement for Syracuse to leave the Big East after the 2012–13 season. At the time, Pittsburgh stated that they had no comment regarding any developments related to their upcoming departure from the Big East. Three days later on July 19, Pitt and the Big East announced they had also settled their dispute, allowing the Panthers to leave for the ACC after the 2012–13 season. Pitt and Syracuse paid $7.5 million each for their 2013 exits, which includes their $5 million exit fee.

On November 20, 2012, Rutgers announced it was joining Maryland in a move to the Big Ten Conference. This once again sparked rumors of the ACC raiding the Big East for a 14th member to replace Maryland, with Louisville and Connecticut being the leading candidates. The Big East responded to these developments on November 27, 2012 by inviting Tulane to join for all sports and East Carolina to join for football only in 2014.

On November 28, 2012, Louisville announced they would join the ACC as the league's 14th football member and 15th member in all sports in 2014, replacing Maryland.

== Split by non-FBS schools ==
On December 10, veteran sportswriter Mark Blaudschun posted on his blog, A Jersey Guy, that the Big East's seven remaining non-FBS schools, all Catholic institutions—DePaul, Georgetown, Marquette, Providence, St. John's, Seton Hall, and Villanova—had met the previous day with commissioner Mike Aresco to discuss their concerns about the future of the conference. This story was soon picked up by multiple national media outlets, including ESPN, CBS Sports, and Sporting News. According to several sources, this was the first meeting among this group of schools, and Blaudschun's original report indicated that the meeting agenda included a potential split by the non-FBS schools.

The meeting came days after CBS Sports reported that the new Big East TV deal, currently up for negotiation, could be worth as little as $60 million per year—significantly less than the $100 million that the conference thought it could receive. This development was especially significant because several incoming Big East schools had negotiated deals regarding conference withdrawal that were linked to the new TV contract. For example, Houston could exit the Big East without penalty if certain TV revenue numbers were not met, and Boise State's buyout fee would be reduced if the total revenue from the new deal dropped by 25%, or if less than 70% of the new contract went to football schools. The basketball-first schools were also concerned about the addition of several new schools without strong histories in the sport. According to ESPN, one source from a Big East football member indicated that the basketball schools were "not thrilled with Tulane and what they will do to the league's RPI", and that they "would have fallen off the ledge if we would have added East Carolina as a full member and what that would have done to the basketball league."

Under normal circumstances, an exit by the non-FBS schools would have forced them to pay exit fees, denied them the use of the Big East brand, and forced them to forego money due them from exit fees of departing members and other members' NCAA basketball tournament appearances. However, Big East bylaws stated that the conference could be dissolved by a two-thirds vote of the all-sports members. The announcement of Louisville's future departure for the ACC meant that only three all-sports members with football were left in the conference—Connecticut, Cincinnati, and South Florida. This would have apparently given the basketball-first schools the power to dissolve the Big East before the five new all-sports members entered on July 1, 2013. This would in turn mean that no exit fees would be due. One wild card in this scenario was the role of Temple, which joined for football in 2012 and was one of the five incoming all-sports members. At the time of the initial reports, it was not certain whether Temple had a vote on membership matters, although it had voting rights on football issues. If Temple had a membership vote, it was seen as likely to use that vote to prevent the dissolution of the Big East. Later reports varied as to Temple's actual voting rights. An ESPN report on December 11 indicated that Temple athletic director Bill Bradshaw had told The Philadelphia Inquirer that his school had full voting rights despite not yet being an all-sports member, seemingly taking the option of dissolution off the table. However, ESPN was told by other sources the following day that Temple had voting rights, but could not vote on dissolution of the league. Finally, it was discovered that despite the non-FBS schools having the necessary majority, dissolution also required the votes of at least two FBS schools, and all three FBS schools with voting rights wanted to keep the league intact. Nonetheless, by December 14, the exit of the basketball-first schools was seen as certain, though numerous details had to be worked out.

The main issues in the split were money-related. Most significantly, it had to be determined which group received major assets belonging to the pre-split conference—such as the "Big East" name, the contract for the conference tournament at Madison Square Garden, and exit fees from schools that previously left the conference.

Conference bylaws allowed for a mass departure without an exit fee, but only if the conference's 27-month notice period was honored. An earlier exit would have required some form of compensation. If the seven departing schools formed a new league, they would keep their automatic bid to the NCAA men's basketball tournament (and also the women's tournament); NCAA rules state that a group of seven or more schools that has been in the same conference for at least five years will keep its bid if they remain together in a new league. The FBS schools would have to petition the NCAA to keep their automatic bid, but an NCAA executive indicated that such a petition would likely be approved.

Many urban private schools with prominent basketball programs and without FBS football teams were seen as potential expansion targets for the new basketball-first league. Media speculation immediately focused on four A10 members that fit this profile: Butler, Dayton, Richmond and Xavier. Two other schools in this category, A10 member Saint Louis and Missouri Valley Conference member Creighton, were also seen as likely candidates, but only if the new conference wanted to expand to 12 members. Two West Coast Conference members, Gonzaga and Saint Mary's, were also seen as possible candidates despite major geographic challenges; Gonzaga athletic director Mike Roth expressed an interest in the new league. Two public schools that otherwise fit the profile of these institutions, George Mason of the CAA and VCU of the A10, were also seen as potential but less likely targets.

On December 15, the seven schools, which the media would soon dub the "Catholic 7", announced that they had voted unanimously to leave the Big East Conference, effective June 30, 2015. It was reported that the "Catholic 7", by leaving, were looking at a lucrative television deal. These non-football teams reportedly had an initial high offer from Fox and its new sports channel, Fox Sports 1, of more than $500 million for 12 years. The deal would allow each of the seven former Big East members to split the rights evenly, earning around $5 million each, and split the rest with future teams. It was widely considered that any additional members would have been content with a share from the leftover after the "Catholic 7" received their initial cut, as no school on the list of potential additions was then making more than $400,000 annually from its media rights. The core group also received interest from NBC and ESPN.

On March 7, 2013, the Big East reached agreement with the "Catholic 7" to allow for their departure June 30, 2013. As part of the agreement, the "Catholic 7" purchased the Big East name and retain the rights to play their tournament at Madison Square Garden, while the FBS schools received $100 million from a $110 million pool that had accumulated from entry fees, exit fees, and NCAA basketball tournament appearances.

== Boise State backs out ==
As the Big Ten was in the midst of its November 2012 wave of expansion that attracted Rutgers from the Big East, ESPN reported that Boise State and San Diego State had second thoughts about joining the Big East for football. According to this report, both schools, as well as FBS independent Brigham Young University (BYU), had been in talks to rejoin the Mountain West. The trigger for these talks was the decision of the BCS commissioners to award an automatic BCS bowl berth, beginning in 2014, to the highest-ranked champion of the so-called "Group of Five" conferences—the Big East, MW, C-USA, MAC, and Sun Belt Conference.

In the interim, Boise State had canceled plans to rejoin the Western Athletic Conference for non-football sports after that conference lost numerous schools in May 2012. Boise State announced on August 24, 2012, that most of their non-football sports would instead rejoin the Big West Conference (where San Diego State was also planning to return its non-football sports after a 35-year absence), which they were in from 1996–2001.

On December 22, 2012, after the "Catholic 7" announced their departure, ESPN followed up with a report that Boise State was playing off the Big East and MW in an attempt to retain TV rights to its home football games. At the time, no football member of an FBS conference retained its home TV rights (and none do to this day). One TV industry source indicated that at least one of the conferences might allow this arrangement, but both conferences and several other industry sources disagreed. Another source said that Boise State was the "linchpin" as to whether the Big East or MW would survive.

This later report indicated that if Boise State opted to remain in the MW, the Big East could become a target for that conference as it sought to expand to 12 football members. Since San Diego State then appeared committed to Big East football, the likeliest candidates were seen as incoming Big East members Houston and SMU, along with C-USA members Tulsa and UTEP. The Big East was not standing still; it had reached out to three MW members (Air Force, Fresno State, and UNLV) and BYU as potential football members. However, Air Force and BYU were apparently content with their current situations, and the other two schools reportedly had no interest in a Big East without Boise State.

On December 31, Boise State announced they had decided to stay in the MW, leaving the Big East, much like TCU, without ever playing a game in it. Boise State decided to remain in the MW because of that conference's geographic proximity and the Big East's continued instability. While the school's attempted TV rights power play was not successful, it did gain several concessions from the MW. Rights to the Broncos' home games would be sold in a separate package from the league's primary contract with the CBS Sports Network. As a part of the deal, any MW member (not just Boise State) that appears in a nationally televised game on ESPN, ESPN2, CBS, NBC (which can only occur if an MW school visits Notre Dame), or Fox would receive a bonus of $300,000, with an extra $200,000 for a Saturday game. Also, beginning in 2014, if an MW team appears in a bowl game associated with the successor to the BCS, the College Football Playoff (either the four-team national playoff, or one of the other so-called "New Year's Six" bowls; one of the latter group has a guaranteed spot for a "Group of Five" team)—the revenue from that game will be split 50-50 between the participating school and the conference. Finally, the MW removed its previous uniform restrictions on Boise State, allowing it to once again wear its standard home blue uniforms in conference games at Bronco Stadium, famous for its blue playing surface.

With Boise State staying in the Mountain West, it was reported that San Diego State would indeed try to rejoin the Mountain West as well. San Diego State's contract with the Big East allowed that school to leave without penalty if there were no other member schools west of the Rockies. The Mountain West was also looking at potentially adding Houston or SMU as its 12th football member, both of which had stated they would join the Big East in 2013 (and would ultimately end up in The American). Also of note was that a provision in Boise State's offer sheet stipulated that if the MW made a membership offer to any school on or before January 31, 2013, the first offer had to be made to San Diego State.

== San Diego State follows suit ==
On January 16, 2013, Blaudschun reported that San Diego State and the Big East were working on a joint release announcing that the Aztecs would not join the Big East, and would stay in the MW. ESPN and CBS Sports quickly picked up the story. The MW presidents voted that day to readmit SDSU.

SDSU was not subject to a Big East exit fee (as noted earlier), but had to pay a $1.5 million exit fee to the Big West. The main concession SDSU received from the MW was that the school would receive its 2012–13 year-end distribution of $2.5 million from the MW, a sum that it had forfeited when it announced its departure.

SDSU athletic director Jim Sherk reportedly tried to make the Big East move work even after Boise State's decision to stay in the MW. While the Big East had one more football season under its current TV deal, which likely would have meant more money for SDSU in the 2013 season, the ongoing membership turnover meant that the Big East could not guarantee or even solidly project future revenue. In addition, the decisions of Boise State and SDSU to stay in the MW meant that the conference would have 12 football members in 2013; as a result, the MW was expected to (and ultimately did) split into divisions and launch a football championship game.

== Post-split developments ==
The new Big East was formally launched at a press conference in New York City on March 20, 2013. The new conference began with 10 members—the "Catholic 7" plus Butler, Creighton, and Xavier. Butler was the only non-Catholic school to be a full member of the new conference until Connecticut rejoined the conference in 2020.

As for the old Big East, its first post-split move came on March 27, when it announced that East Carolina's future membership was being upgraded from football-only to all-sports. According to the Associated Press, the soon-to-be-renamed conference perceived a need to add more members. At the time of the report, it was believed that C-USA member Tulsa would be invited to join in the near future, and on April 2, Tulsa was officially announced as a new member effective in 2014. With Navy still on track to join the renamed conference for football only in 2015, Tulsa's arrival would give the league 12 football members, allowing it to split into divisions and start a championship game. The following day, the old Big East announced that it would change its name to the American Athletic Conference, or "The American" for short, starting on July 1. Although The American is the old Big East's legal successor, both The American and the Big East claim 1979 as their founding date, and the same history up to 2013. For instance, the new Big East claims that it "moved" its headquarters from its longtime home in Providence, Rhode Island (where The American remained based for a time) to New York City. The new Big East named Val Ackerman as its commissioner on its first day of operations; it reckons Ackerman as its fifth commissioner (after Dave Gavitt, Mike Tranghese, John Marinatto and former American commissioner Mike Aresco).

An SB Nation blog covering Villanova sports reported on May 1, 2013, that The American and the new Big East had reached a verbal agreement that the new Big East would take in The American's field hockey and women's lacrosse teams as associate members for at least the 2013–14 school year. When the new Big East launched, it had only three full members that sponsored each sport—Georgetown and Villanova sponsored both sports, Providence sponsored only field hockey, and Marquette began sponsoring women's lacrosse in 2013–14. As for The American, very few of the members that were set to enter in 2013 and 2014 sponsored those sports.

This led to Connecticut, Louisville, Rutgers, and Temple becoming Big East affiliates in both sports, Cincinnati (which does not sponsor field hockey) becoming a women's lacrosse affiliate, and Old Dominion (which had planned to join the original Big East in field hockey) becoming a field hockey affiliate. Rutgers, the only school in The American with a men's lacrosse program, also moved that team to the new Big East. Louisville and Rutgers both played in the Big East for the 2013–14 school year only. At the time of the launch of the reconfigured Big East, Louisville's future home of the ACC sponsored field hockey and women's lacrosse, and Rutgers' eventual home of the Big Ten sponsored field hockey and was set to add men's and women's lacrosse in 2014–15. The story raised the possibility that the other schools could stay as affiliates of the new Big East beyond the 2013–14 school year, which eventually proved true.

In May 2013, the Big East and the University of Denver announced that Denver's men's lacrosse team would leave ECAC Lacrosse to become an affiliate of the new Big East starting in 2013–14 (2014 lacrosse season).

In a postscript, the American dropped the word "Athletic" from its name in July 2025, becoming simply the American Conference.

== Membership changes ==
=== Big East Conference (1979–2013) ===
| School | Sport(s) | Former conference | New conference | Date move was announced | Year when move took effect |
|---|---|---|---|---|---|
| Syracuse Orange | Full membership | Big East | ACC | September 18, 2011 | 2013 |
| Pittsburgh Panthers | Full membership | Big East | ACC | September 18, 2011 | 2013 |
| West Virginia Mountaineers | Full membership | Big East | Big 12 | October 28, 2011 | 2012 |
| Temple Owls | Football | MAC | Big East | March 7, 2012 | 2012 |
| West Virginia Mountaineers | Men's soccer | Big East | MAC | April 3, 2012 | 2012 |
| Loyola (MD) Greyhounds | Women's lacrosse | Big East | Patriot League | August 29, 2012 | 2013 |
| Notre Dame Fighting Irish | Full membership (non-football) | Big East | ACC | September 12, 2012 | 2013 |
| Rutgers Scarlet Knights | Full membership | Big East | Big Ten | November 20, 2012 | 2014 |
| Louisville Cardinals | Full membership | Big East | ACC | November 28, 2012 | 2014 |
| DePaul Blue Demons | Full membership (non-football) | Big East | New Big East | December 14, 2012 | 2013 |
| Georgetown Hoyas | Full membership (non-football) | Big East | New Big East | December 14, 2012 | 2013 |
| Marquette Golden Eagles | Full membership (non-football) | Big East | New Big East | December 14, 2012 | 2013 |
| Providence Friars | Full membership (non-football) | Big East | New Big East | December 14, 2012 | 2013 |
| St. John's Red Storm | Full membership (non-football) | Big East | New Big East | December 14, 2012 | 2013 |
| Seton Hall Pirates | Full membership (non-football) | Big East | New Big East | December 14, 2012 | 2013 |
| Villanova Wildcats | Full membership (non-football) | Big East | New Big East | December 14, 2012 | 2013 |

=== Big East Conference (2013) ===
| School | Sport(s) | Former conference | New conference | Date move was announced | Expected year move takes effect |
|---|---|---|---|---|---|
| DePaul Blue Demons | Full membership (non-football) | Big East | New Big East | December 14, 2012 | 2013 |
| Georgetown Hoyas | Full membership (non-football) | Big East | New Big East | December 14, 2012 | 2013 |
| Marquette Golden Eagles | Full membership (non-football) | Big East | New Big East | December 14, 2012 | 2013 |
| Providence Friars | Full membership (non-football) | Big East | New Big East | December 14, 2012 | 2013 |
| St. John's Red Storm | Full membership (non-football) | Big East | New Big East | December 14, 2012 | 2013 |
| Seton Hall Pirates | Full membership (non-football) | Big East | New Big East | December 14, 2012 | 2013 |
| Villanova Wildcats | Full membership (non-football) | Big East | New Big East | December 14, 2012 | 2013 |
| Butler Bulldogs | Full membership (non-football) | Atlantic 10 | New Big East | March 20, 2013 | 2013 |
| Creighton Bluejays | Full membership (non-football) | Missouri Valley | New Big East | March 20, 2013 | 2013 |
| Xavier Musketeers | Full membership (non-football) | Atlantic 10 | New Big East | March 20, 2013 | 2013 |
| Cincinnati Bearcats | Women's lacrosse | Big East | New Big East | May 1, 2013 | 2013 |
| Connecticut Huskies | Field hockey, women's lacrosse | Big East | New Big East | May 1, 2013 | 2013 |
| Louisville Cardinals | Field hockey, women's lacrosse | Big East | New Big East (2013–14 only) | May 1, 2013 | 2013 |
| Old Dominion Monarchs | Field hockey | CAA | New Big East | May 1, 2013 | 2013 |
| Rutgers Scarlet Knights | Field hockey, men's and women's lacrosse | Big East | New Big East (2013–14 only) | May 1, 2013 | 2013 |
| Temple Owls | Field hockey, women's lacrosse | Atlantic 10 | New Big East | May 1, 2013 | 2013 |
| Denver Pioneers | Men's lacrosse | ECAC Lacrosse | New Big East | May 30, 2013 | 2013 |

=== American Athletic Conference ===
| School | Sport(s) | Former conference | New conference | Date move was announced | Year that move took effect |
|---|---|---|---|---|---|
| Connecticut Huskies | Full membership | Big East | American | May 1, 2013 | 2013 |
| South Florida Bulls | Full membership | Big East | American | May 1, 2013 | 2013 |
| Cincinnati Bearcats | Full membership | Big East | American | May 1, 2013 | 2013 |
| UCF Knights | Full membership | C-USA | American | December 7, 2011 | 2013 |
| Houston Cougars | Full membership | C-USA | American | December 7, 2011 | 2013 |
| SMU Mustangs | Full membership | C-USA | American | December 7, 2011 | 2013 |
| Navy Midshipmen | Football | Independent | American | January 24, 2012 | 2015 |
| Memphis Tigers | Full membership | C-USA | American | February 8, 2012 | 2013 |
| Temple Owls | Full membership | A-10 | American | March 7, 2012 | 2013 |
| East Carolina Pirates | Full membership | C-USA | American | November 27, 2012 | 2014 |
| Tulane Green Wave | Full membership | C-USA | American | November 27, 2012 | 2014 |
| East Carolina Pirates | Full membership | C-USA | American | March 27, 2013 | 2014 |
| Tulsa Golden Hurricane | Full membership | C-USA | American | April 2, 2013 | 2014 |
| Louisville Cardinals | Full membership | Big East | American (2013–14 only) | May 1, 2013 | 2013 |

== See also ==
- NCAA Division I conference realignment
- 2010–2014 NCAA conference realignment
- 2021–2026 NCAA conference realignment
- 2005 NCAA conference realignment
- 1996 NCAA conference realignment
