= 2010–2014 Big Ten Conference realignment =

Changes in college conference composition

The 2010–14 Big Ten Conference realignment refers to the Big Ten Conference dealing with several proposed and actual conference expansion and reduction plans among various NCAA conferences and institutions from 2010 to 2014. U.S. sports media credited expansion plans by the Big Ten as being the trigger for a massive wave of conference realignment during this period. While no Big Ten members announced plans to join other conferences, the league announced expansion from 11 members to an ultimate total of 14 full members and one single-sport associate member, with one full member joining in 2011 and the remaining schools joining in July 2014.

== Background ==
The Big Ten, founded in 1896 as the Intercollegiate Conference of Faculty Representatives (which remained the conference's legal name until 1987), had been for decades one of the more stable major college conferences. Before the 2010–14 realignment, the conference had seen only three changes in membership since World War I. In 1946, the University of Chicago, one of the league's charter members, chose to de-emphasize varsity athletics and left the conference, although it continued its academic affiliation until 2016, when the Big Ten decided to limit its academic arm, originally known as the Committee on Institutional Cooperation and now as the Big Ten Academic Alliance, to full conference members. In 1949, Michigan State University joined the conference, bringing its membership back to 10. The next change came in 1990, when Pennsylvania State University (Penn State) joined.

The first hints of the coming realignment came in December 2009, when Big Ten commissioner Jim Delany announced that the league would consider adding one or more teams. Media reports then indicated that the Big Ten had two major motives for expansion. First, adding one or more schools would increase the reach of the conference's cable network, the Big Ten Network. The conference reportedly received as much as 88 cents per month for every subscriber to the network in the Big Ten member states, and in the 2008–09 fiscal year, the Big Ten Network alone distributed $6.4 million to each of the conference's 11 schools. Second, expanding to 12 or more schools would allow the conference to launch a potentially lucrative conference championship game in football.

In April 2012, after moves by the Big Ten triggered massive realignment, then-CBSSports.com sportswriter Brett McMurphy commented,

It was Jim Delany's cow in a Chicago barn that kicked over the lantern that started the country's conference realignment inferno. After that it was a hundred reactionary moves from other conference commissioners, shoring up their ranks, while scorching college football's landscape.

== First wave: Nebraska joins ==
After the Big Ten's initial announcement that it was looking at expansion in December 2009, rumors about possible expansion targets and the possibility that the conference might expand to as many as 14 or 16 teams circulated into May 2010. On June 11, 2010, Nebraska applied for membership in the Big Ten and was unanimously approved as the conference's 12th school. Its membership became effective July 1, 2011. Big Ten officials later stated that they had no plans to expand beyond 12 teams in the near future.

Furthermore, the decision by Penn State to add varsity men's ice hockey starting in 2012 triggered a series of changes in college ice hockey conference alignment. Most significantly, the number of Big Ten universities with men's ice hockey programs reached six, the minimum number of teams needed by a conference to receive an automatic bid into the NCAA tournament. Thus, in 2011, the Big Ten member institutions voted to add men's ice hockey as a conference-sponsored sport beginning in 2013. The decision required the five existing men's ice hockey programs from Big Ten member schools to leave their current conferences – Minnesota and Wisconsin from the Western Collegiate Hockey Association, and Michigan, Michigan State, and Ohio State from the Central Collegiate Hockey Association.

== Second wave: Maryland and Rutgers join ==
However, in mid-November 2012, the landscape changed, as ESPN reported that the University of Maryland, a charter member of the Atlantic Coast Conference (ACC), was in "serious negotiations" to join the Big Ten. Yahoo! Sports confirmed the news, and added that Big East Conference member Rutgers University was also in advanced talks to join the Big Ten.

These reports noted that the Big Ten's then-current first-tier media rights deal was set to expire in 2017, and the conference was preparing for negotiations on a new deal. Both potential new members offer access to large new media markets for the conference. Maryland is in the Washington suburb of College Park, and is also within 35 miles (56 km) of another large media market in Baltimore. Rutgers is located in the New York City market, the largest in the country. Both schools are also members of the Association of American Universities, a status viewed as very important to the leaders of current Big Ten members (every Big Ten member institution except Nebraska is a member of the AAU; Nebraska was an AAU member when it was approved to join). The ESPN report indicated that Maryland was somewhat torn over the possible move. Two key players for Maryland in the negotiations, president Wallace Loh and athletic director Kevin Anderson, did not have ACC ties, and Loh was a former provost of Big Ten member Iowa. However, the chancellor of the University System of Maryland (USM) that ultimately oversees the school, Brit Kirwan, had been on the College Park campus for 30 years and, according to ESPN, had a strong affinity for the ACC. In addition, one of the Maryland regents told ESPN that Under Armour founder and major Maryland athletic booster Kevin Plank was "100 percent" behind a Big Ten move, and was heavily lobbying regents. On November 19, the Maryland regents voted to accept the Big Ten's offer, and the Big Ten presidents unanimously approved Maryland's entry later that day. The Terrapins officially joined on July 1, 2014. The Rutgers board of governors held a regularly scheduled meeting on the same day that the Maryland regents voted, and voted to authorize athletic director Tim Pernetti to accept the Big Ten's invitation. The Big Ten unanimously accepted Rutgers' application on November 20; however, the announcement only said that the school would join "at a date to be determined".

Neither athletic department was in a strong financial position at the time. The Star-Ledger of Newark reported in December 2011 that Rutgers' athletic department had lost nearly $27 million in the 2010–11 academic year, and in July 2012, Maryland dropped seven varsity teams due to a deficit reported by The Washington Post as $4 million. In addition, the ACC voted earlier in 2012 to increase its exit fee to $50 million; the only two members to vote against the increase were Maryland and Florida State. Sources at Maryland believed that the school would be able to negotiate the buyout downward. Rutgers faced a less steep exit fee of $10 million, but the Big East requires 27 months' notice. However, at least three schools that had left the Big East during the current realignment cycle had been able to buy themselves out of the full waiting period. In the days leading up to the Maryland and Rutgers moves, another current Big East member, Connecticut, was seen as the most likely candidate to replace the Terrapins in the ACC, with still another Big East member, Louisville, also seen as a possible ACC target.

Forbes magazine speculated that Plank, estimated by the magazine to be worth more than $1.3 billion, was a key driving force in Maryland's Big Ten move. In the week before the Big Ten negotiations were revealed, Under Armour filed a statement with the Securities and Exchange Commission indicating that Plank would sell 1.3 million shares in the company. According to Forbes, this sale would net about $56 million after taxes, more than enough to cover the full ACC buyout. However, ESPN later reported that the Forbes speculation was inaccurate, with unnamed sources saying that Plank would not use the funds from the sale for the school's benefit.

In December 2012, another part of the Big Ten's rationale for its latest round of expansion was revealed by Barry Alvarez, athletic director of conference charter member Wisconsin. As reported by the Milwaukee Journal Sentinel, Alvarez told the school's athletics board,

Jim [Delany] felt that someday, if we didn’t have anyone else in that corridor [i.e., Northeast Corridor], someday it wouldn’t make sense maybe for Penn State to be in our league. That they would go into a league somewhere on the east coast. By doing that [adding Maryland and Rutgers], it keeps us in the northeast corridor.

Still more light was shed on the situation in late May 2013, when comments made by Ohio State president Gordon Gee in a December 2012 talk to the university's athletic council were made public. Media attention focused on comments that were interpreted as slurs against Catholics and Notre Dame, plus digs at former Wisconsin football coach Bret Bielema, the Southeastern Conference, the University of Cincinnati, and Kentucky's two major state universities of Kentucky and Louisville. The furor over Gee's comments soon led him to retire effective July 1, 2013. However, his comments also included his takes on current and possible future Big Ten realignment:

- "I think we’re moving precipitously toward about three or four superconferences of about 16 to 20 teams. And the possibility of them bolting from the NCAA is not unlikely."
- The addition of Maryland and Rutgers "gives us 40 to 50 million more viewers, makes the BTN [Big Ten Network] worth more money than God. I did say that. It’s a very powerful instrument for us."
- "Very candidly, I think we made a mistake. Because [we] thought about adding Missouri and Kansas at the time. There was not a great deal of enthusiasm about that. I think we should have done that at the time. So we would have had Nebraska, Missouri, Kansas and then moved into that other area. I think, by the way, that that can still happen."
- "If the ACC continues to struggle, and Florida State goes off to the SEC or something like that, and Clemson moves in a different direction, all of a sudden Virginia, Duke, and North Carolina — which are all very similar institutions to the Big Ten, there is a real possibility that we may end up having that kind of T which goes south. And I could see them joining us. And I could see them having a real interest in joining us."

== Addition of lacrosse and first-ever associate member ==
In June 2013, the Big Ten announced that with the arrival of Maryland and Rutgers, both of which sponsor lacrosse for both men and women, the conference would begin sponsoring the sport for both sexes in the 2014–15 school year (2015 lacrosse season). Michigan, Ohio State, and Penn State already sponsored both men's and women's lacrosse, while Northwestern sponsored the sport for women only. The two new full members brought the Big Ten to six schools with women's lacrosse, the minimum number of schools required under conference bylaws for the sponsoring of an official Big Ten championship. With five men's lacrosse schools set for 2014–15, the Big Ten added its sixth program by inviting Johns Hopkins University as an affiliate member for that sport only. Hopkins is an NCAA Division III member that fields Division I teams in men's and women's lacrosse. Also, like all other Big Ten members except for Nebraska, it is an AAU member. The Hopkins men's team, which had played as an independent since its creation in 1883, is one of the most successful in college history, with a total of 44 national championships (nine NCAA championships, second all-time to Syracuse, and 35 pre-NCAA national titles). Hopkins became the first affiliate member in Big Ten history.

The official Johns Hopkins press release announcing this move indicated that it was driven largely by the school's desire to join a conference with an automatic bid to the NCAA tournament. The then-current wave of conference realignment was making it more difficult for Hopkins to fill out a nationally competitive schedule. The Blue Jays' familiarity with the Big Ten's present and future men's lacrosse programs was also a major factor in the school's decision to affiliate with that conference. Hopkins' rivalry with Maryland is one of the sport's most famous, having first been played in 1895. The Blue Jays have played Rutgers intermittently since 1920, added Michigan to their regular-season schedule in 2013, and at the time of the announcement played their two annual preseason exhibitions against Ohio State and Penn State. The Big Ten reportedly allowed Hopkins to keep its then-current television contract with ESPNU for its home games.

Hopkins' move was seen as having major ramifications for future conference realignment within men's lacrosse. An SB Nation lacrosse blog called the future of ECAC Lacrosse into serious doubt. That conference was already set to lose Loyola to the Patriot League and Denver to the Big East, and would then lose Michigan and Ohio State to the Big Ten. Barring any future moves, the ECAC would have been left with an unsustainable four-team league in 2014–15. The Colonial Athletic Association, which would lose Penn State to the Big Ten, was tentatively left with six men's lacrosse teams in 2015. According to the blog, "The formation of the Big Ten lacrosse league was the biggest realignment issue out there [in men's lacrosse], and its effects are ill-defined."

Within weeks of Hopkins' move, three of the four remaining ECAC Lacrosse teams announced their departure for other conferences, signaling the demise of that league after the 2014 season. First, on June 18, Fairfield announced it would move its men's lacrosse team to the CAA for 2014–15, effectively replacing Penn State in that league. Then, on July 1, Hobart, like Johns Hopkins a Division III institution with a Division I lacrosse program, announced it was joining the Northeast Conference effective immediately. One week later, Bellarmine, a Division II school with a Division I lacrosse team, announced it would become an affiliate of the Atlantic Sun Conference (A-Sun) in 2014–15 (it ultimately joined the Southern Conference following the January 2014 announcement of an alliance between that league and the A-Sun, under whose terms the Southern Conference took over A-Sun men's lacrosse). These moves left Air Force as the only ECAC Lacrosse member that had no confirmed conference home for the 2015 season; it would ultimately play that season as an independent before becoming a lacrosse member of the Southern Conference for the 2016 season.

The Big Ten lacrosse announcement also led to the demise of the American Lacrosse Conference (ALC), a women's lacrosse league which had been home to the four pre-2015 Big Ten women's lacrosse programs. With four of its seven members leaving for the Big Ten, and Johns Hopkins announcing its move to independence, the ALC was left with only two members, Florida and Vanderbilt. Both became single-sport members of the Big East Conference effective with the 2015 season.

== Membership changes ==
School	Sport(s)	Former conference	New conference	Date move was announced	Year move took effect
Nebraska Cornhuskers	Full membership	Big 12	Big Ten	June 11, 2010	2011
Minnesota Golden Gophers	Men's ice hockey	WCHA	Big Ten	March 21, 2011	2013
Wisconsin Badgers	Men's ice hockey	WCHA	Big Ten	March 21, 2011	2013
Michigan Wolverines	Men's ice hockey	CCHA	Big Ten	March 21, 2011	2013
Michigan State Spartans	Men's ice hockey	CCHA	Big Ten	March 21, 2011	2013
Ohio State Buckeyes	Men's ice hockey	CCHA	Big Ten	March 21, 2011	2013
Penn State Nittany Lions	Men's ice hockey	Independent	Big Ten	March 21, 2011	2013
Maryland Terrapins	Full membership	ACC	Big Ten	November 19, 2012	2014
Rutgers Scarlet Knights	Full membership	Big East (Note: Rutgers spent the 2013–14 school year in the American Athletic Conference before leaving for the Big Ten.)	Big Ten	November 20, 2012	2014
Michigan Wolverines	Men's lacrosse	ECAC Lacrosse League	Big Ten	June 3, 2013	2014
Ohio State Buckeyes	Men's lacrosse	ECAC Lacrosse League	Big Ten	June 3, 2013	2014
Penn State Nittany Lions	Men's lacrosse	CAA	Big Ten	June 3, 2013	2014
Maryland Terrapins	Men's and women's lacrosse	ACC	Big Ten	June 3, 2013	2014
Rutgers Scarlet Knights	Men's and women's lacrosse	New Big East (Note: As part of the separation agreement of the former Big East Conference, the American Athletic Conference agreed that it would not sponsor lacrosse. In turn, the new Big East agreed to take in all of The American's men's and women's lacrosse programs as associate members.)	Big Ten	June 3, 2013	2014
Johns Hopkins Blue Jays	Men's lacrosse	Independent	Big Ten	June 3, 2013	2014
Michigan Wolverines	Women's lacrosse	ALC	Big Ten	June 3, 2013	2014
Northwestern Wildcats	Women's lacrosse	ALC	Big Ten	June 3, 2013	2014
Penn State Nittany Lions	Women's lacrosse	ALC	Big Ten	June 3, 2013	2014
Ohio State Buckeyes	Women's lacrosse	ALC	Big Ten	June 3, 2013	2014

=== Gallery of Big Ten membership changes ===
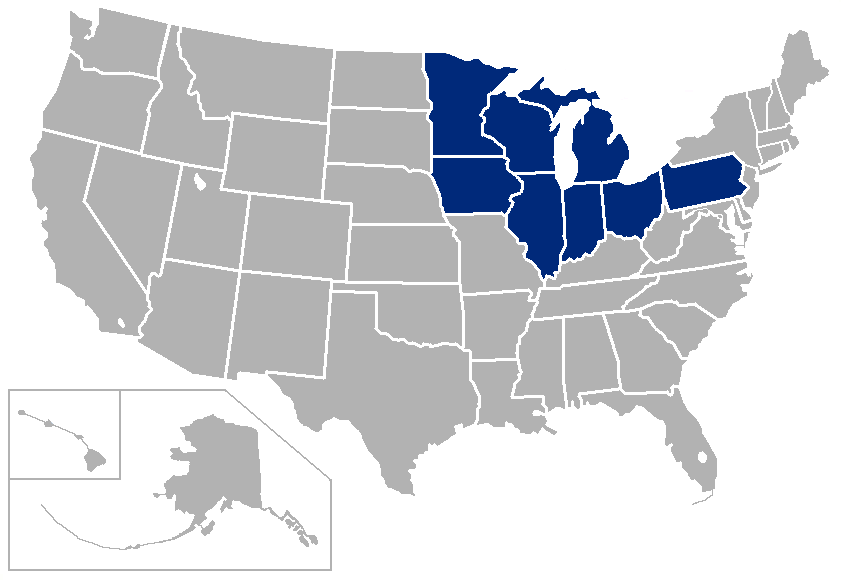
A map of the Big Ten as it existed between 1993 and 2011

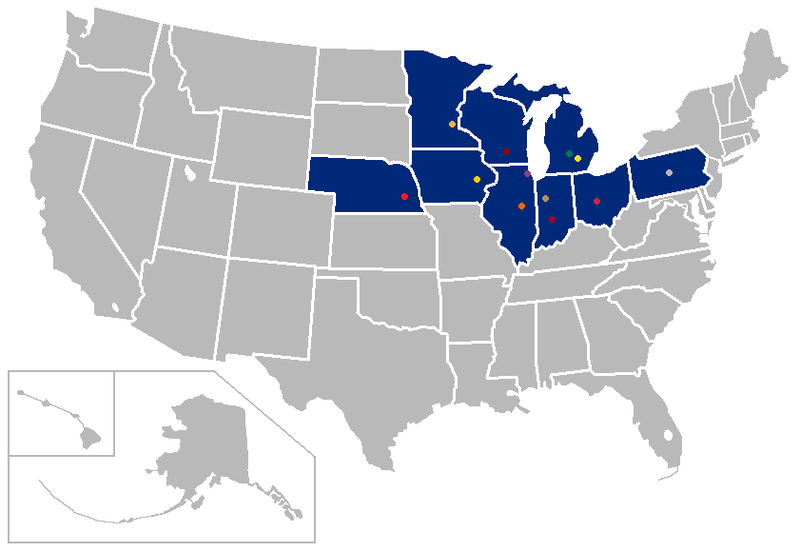
The Big Ten as it existed between 2011 and 2014, after the addition of Nebraska

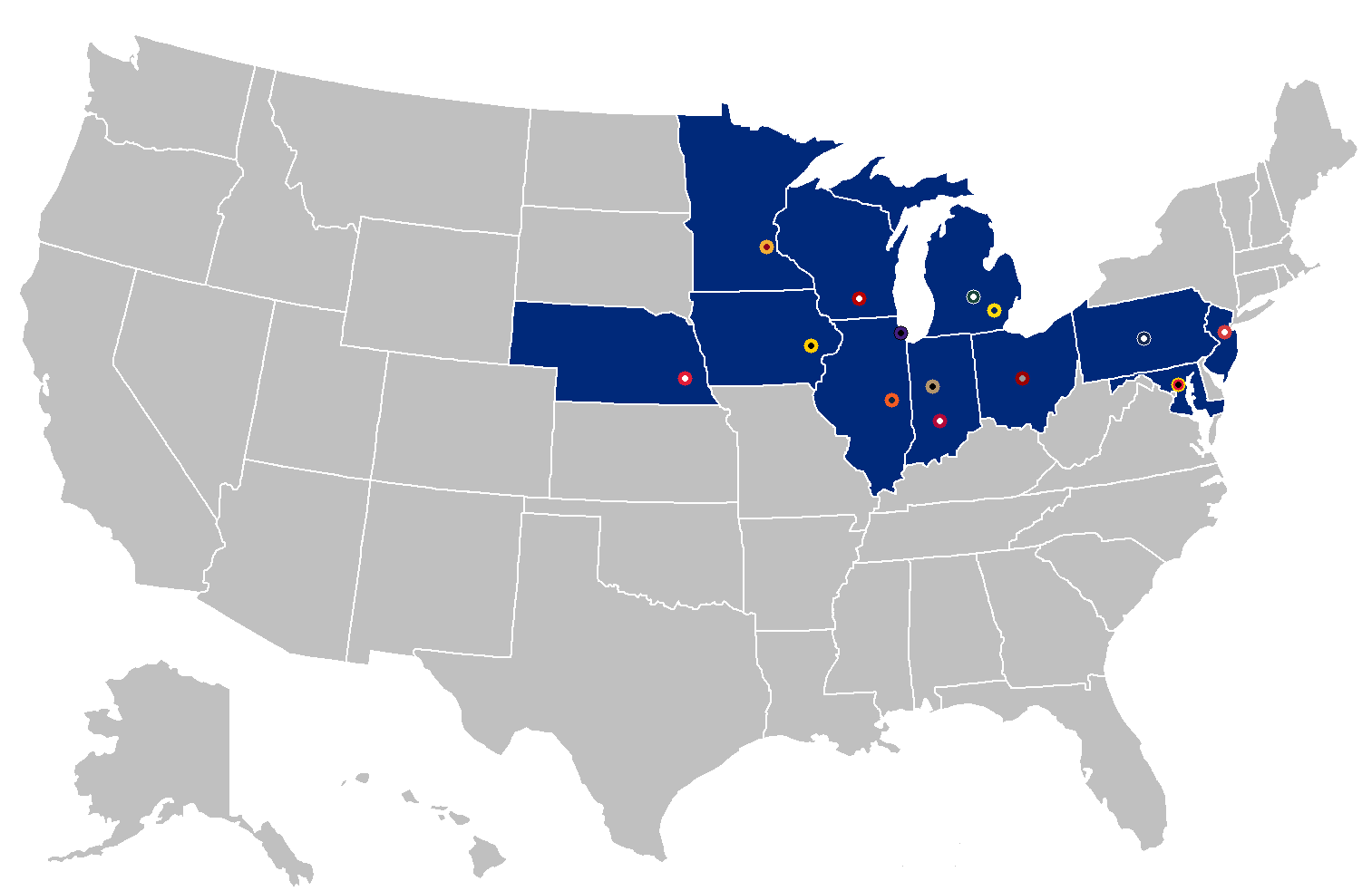
The Big Ten as it existed between 2014 and 2024, after the additions of Maryland and Rutgers

== See also ==
- NCAA conference realignment
- 2021–2026 NCAA conference realignment
- 2005 NCAA conference realignment
- 1996 NCAA conference realignment
