= Mike Tranghese =

American sports commissioner

Michael Tranghese (born c. 1943) is the former commissioner of the Big East Conference and helped create the conference as founder Dave Gavitt's right-hand man in 1979. Tranghese retired as commissioner in the spring of 2009, with John Marinatto succeeding him as commissioner. Tranghese later served as a member of the College Football Playoff selection committee. He's a 1965 graduate of Saint Michael's College, where he was a member of the golf team. He was inducted into the school's athletic hall of fame in 1996.
