= Michael Aresco =

American college sports administrator

Michael L. "Mike" Aresco is an American college sports and television executive. Aresco was the commissioner of the American Athletic Conference (AAC/The American), a college athletics conference now known as the American Conference, from its de facto formation in 2013 until his retirement on May 31, 2024. He was the last commissioner of the old Big East Conference from August 14, 2012 to June 30, 2013. He continued as commissioner of The American, the legal successor to the old Big East, when that league formally began operations on July 1, 2013.

== Early life ==
The grandson of Italian immigrants, Aresco grew up in Connecticut and worked for an uncle's company in his teens, working in manual labor in various construction-related jobs. He went on to graduate from Tufts University's Fletcher School of Law and Diplomacy and the University of Connecticut School of Law. He practiced law privately in Hartford, Connecticut for several years.

== Move into television ==
Aresco's career path changed in 1983. He told New York Times reporter Chris Vannini in 2024 that he was out to dinner with his wife, recounting a Boston Globe story about a Major League Baseball ownership situation, when a man at the next table tapped him on the shoulder to get in on the discussion. This man was Steve Saferini, who had recently become an ESPN executive. Aresco and Saferini became friends, and Saferini later suggested that Aresco join ESPN's legal team. Tiring of private law practice, he joined ESPN in 1984, rising to an assistant general counsel position before moving to the programming department.

During his time in ESPN programming, he was involved with 20 different sports, but made his mark in college football and basketball. Aresco is credited with starting ESPN's Thursday night football broadcasts, though he stated that the idea was not originally his, and also helped to develop the network's comprehensive bowl game coverage before moving to CBS Sports.

While at CBS, Aresco got feedback from college football fans in the Northeast who wanted to see Southeastern Conference (SEC) games instead of the Big East games that were aired regionally. He pitched the idea of a national SEC package to CBS Sports president Sean McManus, and the two, along with vice president and future Big Ten Conference commissioner Tony Petitti, negotiated a deal with the conference. SEC football became a fixture of CBS Saturday programming through the 2023 season. Eventually rising to Executive Vice President, Programming of CBS Sports, Aresco was also responsible for moving the Army–Navy Game to its current date of the Saturday after FBS conference championship games. In college basketball, he organized the network's coverage of the NCAA Division I men's tournament, setting up the schedule and time slots for each game. Aresco also negotiated CBS' continuing coverage of the Masters Tournament with Augusta National Golf Club each year.

== Conference administration ==
During the early-2010s conference realignment, Aresco was, according to Vannini, frustrated with the Big East's slow pace in TV negotiations. In 2012, Big East mainstays Pitt and Syracuse had announced their 2013 departure for the Atlantic Coast Conference. Doug Woodward, then athletic director at the University of South Florida, told Aresco that he was ideal for the Big East commissioner's opening, and he soon joined, making him possibly the first conference commissioner to come directly from TV sports. By the time Aresco joined, two other Big East schools (non-football member Notre Dame and full member Rutgers) were deep in negotiations with other conferences, with both eventually leaving the Big East/American, and shortly after Aresco took office, the so-called "Catholic 7" schools that did not sponsor FBS football left and bought the Big East name. He managed to bring in several schools from Conference USA and negotiate a TV deal with ESPN, keeping the renamed American Athletic Conference alive. Aresco would see the conference through a second round of realignment before retiring in 2024.
