= Big East Conference (1979–2013) =

U.S. college athletic conference, 1979–2013

- Association: NCAA
- Founded: May 31, 1979; 47 years ago
- Folded: July 1, 2013; 13 years ago (reorganized as American Athletic Conference)/Big East
- Commissioner: Dave Gavitt (first); Michael Aresco (last)
- Sports fielded: 24; men's: 11; women's: 13
- Division: Division I
- No. of teams: 7–16 full members
- Headquarters: Providence, Rhode Island
- Region: Northeast; South Atlantic; Midwest; Southeast
- Website: bigeast.org

Locations
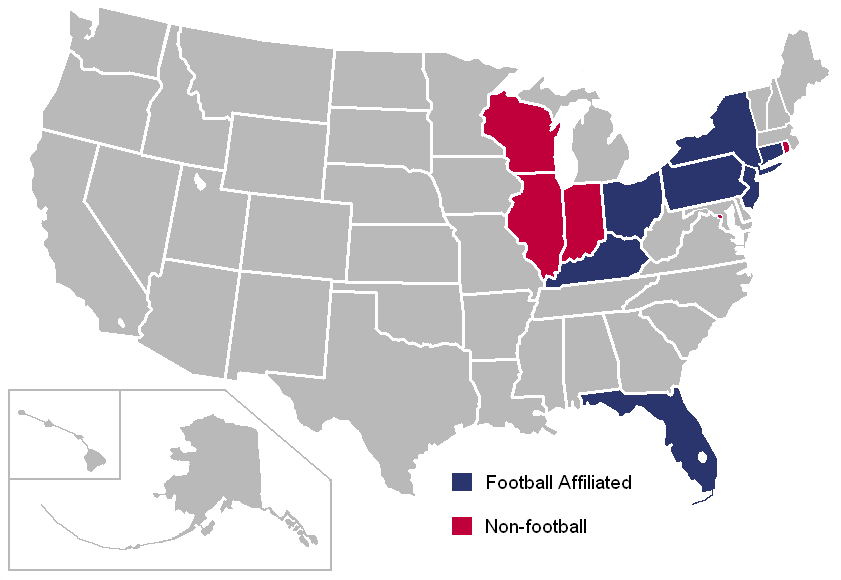

The Big East Conference was a collegiate athletics conference that consisted of as many as 16 universities in the eastern half of the United States from 1979 to 2013. The conference's members participated in 24 NCAA sports. The conference had a history of success at the national level in basketball throughout its history, while its shorter (1991 to 2013) football program, created by inviting one college and four other "associate members" (their football programs only) into the conference, resulted in two national championships.

In basketball, Big East teams made 18 Final Four appearances and won 7 NCAA championships as Big East members through 2013 (UConn with three, Georgetown, Syracuse, Louisville and Villanova with one each). Of the Big East's full members, all but South Florida attended the Final Four, the most of any conference, though Marquette, DePaul, Notre Dame, Rutgers, Cincinnati, and Pittsburgh made all their trips before joining the Big East. In 2011, the Big East set the record for the most teams sent to the NCAA Division I Men's Basketball Championship by a single conference with eleven out of their sixteen teams qualifying.

In football, the Big East entered competition as a conference in 1991, after inviting five football colleges to become members of the Big East, joining three teams from the Big East whose football teams were competing as Division I independents (Boston College, Pittsburgh and Syracuse) to form a new Division I football league. The strength of this league earned the Big East an automatic berth in the Bowl Championship Series, when that series was created in 1998. The Big East won two national football championships, both by University of Miami. Between 2005 and 2012, four of the more successful football schools left the Big East for other conferences, starting a process that led to a complete realignment of the Big East in 2013.

On July 1, 2013, the non-football playing schools (also known collectively as the Catholic 7) formed a non-football playing conference that purchased the Big East Conference name. The remaining six football-playing members, three of whom had only joined the Big East in 2005 when the earlier exodus had started, joined with four schools from other conferences to become the American Athletic Conference (The American/AAC), which is the Big East's legal successor. The American retains the Big East's football structure and inherited its single automatic berth in the Bowl Championship Series. However, both conferences claim 1979 as their founding date, and the same history up to 2013. As of the 2024–25 season, South Florida is the only full member of the original Big East that still plays in the AAC today.

== History ==
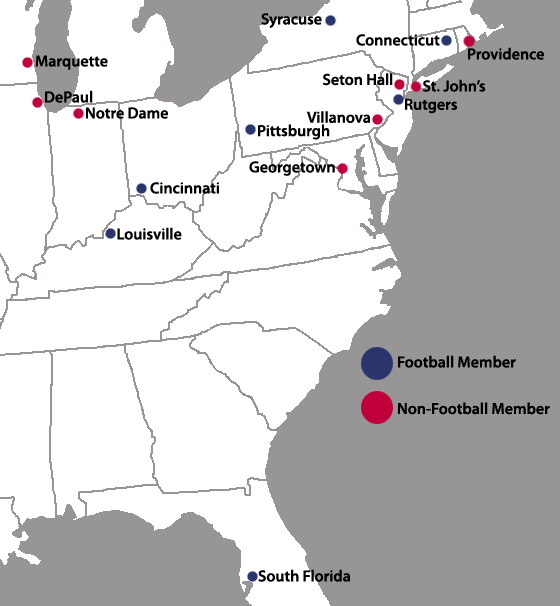
Locations of the Big East Conference full member institutions for the conference's final academic year (2012–13)

=== Founding: the early years ===
The Big East, often referred to as the Classic Big East, was founded in 1979 after new NCAA basketball scheduling requirements caused the athletic directors of independent schools Providence, St. John's, Georgetown, and Syracuse to discuss the creation of a conference centered in the Northeast. Other schools invited were Seton Hall, Connecticut, Holy Cross, Rutgers, and Boston College, with Rutgers and Holy Cross declining to join. Villanova joined a year later in 1980 and Pittsburgh joined in 1982. Before the formation of the conference, many of these schools participated in the ECAC men's basketball tournament in order to receive an automatic bid for the NCAA Division I Men's Basketball Championship.

In 1982, Penn State applied for membership, but was rejected, with only five schools in favor (Penn State needed six out of eight). It was long rumored that Syracuse cast the deciding vote against Penn State, but Mike Tranghese confirmed that this was not the case and that Syracuse had, in fact, voted for Penn State's inclusion. Penn State would loom large over the conference during future rounds of realignment as the Nittany Lions had the potential to shore up the conference once football members began to join. Following the decisions by Georgetown, St. John's, and fellow Pennsylvania school Villanova to vote against Penn State's admission, then-Big Ten administrator and future-Big East commissioner Mike Tranghese said the conference would "rue the day" they rejected the Nittany Lions.

=== Football expansion ===
About a decade after the conference's inception, Big East members decided to become a major football conference. As only Boston College, Syracuse and Pittsburgh were playing football at the Division 1-A level, the Big East added five schools including Rutgers, Miami, Temple, Virginia Tech, and West Virginia – though only Miami would be offered full all-sports membership immediately. The inaugural Big East football season launched in 1991. West Virginia and Rutgers were offered admission to the Big East as full members starting in the 1995–96 academic year, and Notre Dame, committed to its football independence, was offered a non-football membership effective the same year. In 1994, the Big East gave Connecticut a four-year window to upgrade its football program to Division 1-A, with the school officially applying to the conference in 1999. After joining Division 1-A as an independent in 2000, the school was expected to join the rest of the Big East on a full-fledged basis in football in 2005. Virginia Tech would be forced to wait until 2000–01 for full admission, and Temple remained a football-only member until 2004, when it was voted out of the conference due to poor attendance figures, lack of playing success, and inadequate facilities.

=== Turmoil and realignment ===
Some have argued that the unusual structure of the Big East, with the "football" and "non-football" schools, led to instability in the conference. In 2003, the ongoing press reports of tensions between the football schools and the basketball-only schools finally exploded into a months-long public tug-of-war between the Big East and the Atlantic Coast Conference over several Big East members. The result was that three Big East schools—Virginia Tech, Miami and Boston College—moved to the ACC, while five schools moved to the Big East from Conference USA—Louisville, Cincinnati, South Florida, Marquette, and DePaul. Connecticut joined the Big East as a football playing member in 2004, one year earlier than originally planned.

The addition of the three football schools and Connecticut, ensured that the league would keep the minimum eight teams needed to keep its BCS bid. In addition, two traditional basketball teams, DePaul and Marquette, were added to gain the Chicago and Milwaukee television markets and help the already solid basketball status of the conference.

Meanwhile, Loyola University Maryland (then Loyola College in Maryland) also joined the Big East as an associate member in women's lacrosse for the 2005–06 academic year.

=== Continued instability ===
In 2010, Texas Christian University accepted an invitation to join the conference as an all-sports member beginning in the 2012–13 academic year. Big East schools compete in Division I. Most of the football-playing schools play in Division I FBS, while Georgetown and Villanova have Division I FCS (formerly I-AA) football programs. Georgetown football competes in the Patriot League. Villanova has competed in the Colonial Athletic Association football conference since 1988, dating back to its time as a completely separate conference known as the Yankee Conference, which merged with the Atlantic 10 Conference in 1997, then in 2007 the CAA took over management of the A-10 football conference (which happened after Northeastern University joined the CAA in 2005, giving them the six football-playing members needed to start sponsoring football, which was eventually dropped by Northeastern after 2009). In September 2010, in the wake of a Division I realignment that affected a number of conferences around the country, the Big East asked Villanova to consider becoming a football member. The school once considered the offer, which required the school to substantially expand its football budget, as well as expand its stadium to meet FBS requirements or find another suitable venue in the Philadelphia area. Villanova presented a plan to the Big East football members on April 10, 2011, which included the use of PPL Park as a football stadium, but the league declined to schedule a vote to offer membership on the objections of Pittsburgh, West Virginia and Rutgers to the plan. On September 17, 2011, Syracuse, a charter member of the conference, and Pittsburgh announced that they would be leaving the Big East for the Atlantic Coast Conference. Both schools originally intended to fulfill their commitment to the 27-month waiting period. TCU also reversed its decision and accepted an invitation from the Big 12 Conference to move there.

On October 28, 2011, it was announced by the Big 12 Conference that West Virginia accepted its invitation to join, with membership beginning in 2012. This timeline was challenged by the Big East, and countersuits were launched by the school and conference. Eventually, a settlement was reached with allowed West Virginia's departure for 2012 in exchange for sizable compensation. Syracuse and Pittsburgh then used the acquiescence of the Big East to West Virginia's departure to challenge the validity of their own commitment, and the Big East agreed to a settlement with both schools in July 2012 to allow their departure for the 2013 academic year.

In December, after the 2011 football regular season was completed announcements were made that Boise State University and San Diego State University, both of the Mountain West Conference, would join the Big East in football only; and that Conference USA members University of Central Florida, Southern Methodist University, and the University of Houston would join in all sports for the 2013 academic year.

On January 24, 2012, the Navy Midshipmen accepted an invitation to join the Big East for football only starting in 2015.

On February 9, 2012, the Big East invited the University of Memphis to join as a full member in all sports to begin play in 2013.

On March 7, 2012, it was announced that Temple University would return to the conference for football in the 2012 season, filling the void left by West Virginia. Temple would join for all sports in 2013. Temple basketball would move over from the Atlantic 10 Conference, where they have been a perennial powerhouse.

On August 29, 2012, Loyola and the Patriot League announced that all Loyola athletic teams, including the school's Big East team in women's lacrosse, would join that conference on July 1, 2013.

On September 12, 2012, Notre Dame announced it would follow Pittsburgh and Syracuse to the ACC, joining that league in all sports except football. Notre Dame and the Big East reached agreement on March 13, 2013; the exit took place July 1, 2013.

On November 20, 2012, Rutgers announced it would be leaving the Big East to join the Big Ten Conference as a full member, effective with the start of the 2014–15 academic year. Rutgers' announcement came one day after the University of Maryland departed the ACC to join the Big Ten. One week later, on November 27, Tulane University accepted the Big East's invitation to join as an all-sports member. East Carolina University's football program also joined the Big East in 2014; both schools were previously with Conference USA. The following day the ACC voted to invite Louisville to join in 2014, making them the seventh school since 2004 to leave the Big East in favor of the ACC. On March 27, 2013, East Carolina's future membership in the renamed conference was officially upgraded to all-sports membership.

=== Conference split ===
==== New Big East ====
Less than two weeks after Louisville announced its departure for the ACC, multiple media reports indicated that the Big East's seven remaining non-FBS schools, all Catholic institutions, were considering a mass exit from the conference. By December 13, it was likely that the non-FBS schools would indeed leave to form a new conference, and on December 15, the seven schools (soon to be called the Catholic 7 by the media) made their departure official, effective with the 2015–16 school year. Many details remained to be worked out, with one major issue being whether the "Big East" name would stay with the FBS schools.

On December 31, Boise State announced they had decided to stay in the Mountain West conference, leaving the Big East, much like TCU, without ever playing a game in it. With Boise State staying in the Mountain West, it was noted that San Diego State would indeed try to rejoin the Mountain West as well. On January 16, 2013, reports surfaced that SDSU would indeed stay in the Mountain West. Rumors of the MWC looking at potentially adding Houston and SMU as its 13th and 14th football members, both of which had stated they would join the Big East in 2013, continued to circulate as well.

In February 2013, multiple media reports indicated that the Catholic 7 would depart in July 2013, two years earlier than originally planned. On March 5, the Associated Press reported tentative details of a financial agreement: In exchange for selling both the Big East name and a contract with Madison Square Garden (MSG) to host the men's basketball tournament to the Catholic 7, as well as $10 million, the football schools would receive $100 million of a $110 million pool that had accumulated from entry fees, exit fees, and proceeds earned from appearances in the NCAA men's basketball tournament. On April 3, the football-playing schools, which retained the old Big East's structure and its automatic BCS bid, announced they would operate as the American Athletic Conference starting on July 1.

=== Membership timeline ===
Full members Full members (non-football) Assoc. members (football only) Independent New Big East American Athletic Conference Other Conference Other Conference

=== Subsequent conference affiliations ===
| Team | Left for | Current conference |
|---|---|---|
| Connecticut | American Athletic Conference | Big East Conference (plays as football independent) |
| Rutgers | American Athletic Conference | Big Ten Conference |
| Louisville | American Athletic Conference | Atlantic Coast Conference |
| Cincinnati | American Athletic Conference | Big 12 Conference |
| Syracuse | Atlantic Coast Conference | |
| Pittsburgh | Atlantic Coast Conference | |
| Boston College | Atlantic Coast Conference | |
| Virginia Tech | Atlantic Coast Conference | |
| Miami | Atlantic Coast Conference | |
| Notre Dame | Atlantic Coast Conference (plays as football independent) | |
| West Virginia | Big 12 | |
| Georgetown | new Big East Conference | |
| Marquette | new Big East Conference | |
| Villanova | new Big East Conference | |
| Providence | new Big East Conference | |
| DePaul | new Big East Conference | |
| St. John's | new Big East Conference | |
| Seton Hall | new Big East Conference | |
| Temple | American Athletic Conference | |
| South Florida | American Athletic Conference | |

== Commissioners ==
| Years | Commissioners |
|---|---|
| 1979–1990 | Dave Gavitt |
| 1990–2009 | Mike Tranghese |
| 2009–2012 | John Marinatto |
| 2012 | Joseph Bailey (Interim) |
| 2012–2024 | Michael Aresco |
| 2024-present | Tim Pernetti |

Mike Tranghese retired at the end of the 2008–09 academic year, which he announced in June 2008, and was replaced by former senior associate commissioner John Marinatto. On May 7, 2012, John Marinatto resigned as commissioner. He was replaced by Joseph Bailey on an interim basis. Mike Aresco, the Executive Vice President of CBS Sports' Programming, was named Commissioner of The Big East on August 14, 2012. After the old Big East changed its name to the American Athletic Conference, Aresco continued as commissioner. The new Big East named Val Ackerman as commissioner on July 1, but reckons her as its fifth commissioner. Following Aresko's retirement on May 31, 2024, Tim Pernetti officially took over as the Commissioner of The American Conference.

== Member institutions ==
As of the beginning of the 2012–13 academic year, there were 15 full members and two associate members of the Big East. On July 1, 2013, Pittsburgh, Syracuse, and Notre Dame joined the ACC. DePaul, Georgetown, Marquette, Providence, St. John's, Seton Hall, and Villanova joined the new Big East. Cincinnati, Connecticut, South Florida, and Temple remained in the old Big East, which changed its name to the American Athletic Conference. Rutgers and Louisville played one season in the AAC before joining the Big Ten and ACC, respectively, for 2014–15.

=== Full members ===
| Institution | Location (Population) | Founded | Type | Enrollment | Year Joined | Nickname | Endowment | Current Conference |
|---|---|---|---|---|---|---|---|---|
| University of Cincinnati | Cincinnati, Ohio (309,317) | 1819 | Public | 41,357 | 2005 | Bearcats | $1,004,000,000 | Big 12 |
| University of Connecticut | Storrs, Connecticut (15,344) | 1881 | Public | 30,034 | 1979 | Huskies | $447,700,000 | Big East (Independent in football) |
| University of Louisville | Louisville, Kentucky (741,096) | 1798 | Public | 23,262 | 2005 | Cardinals | $762,300,000 | ACC |
| University of Pittsburgh | Pittsburgh, Pennsylvania (305,704) | 1787 | Public/State-Related | 28,823 | 1982 | Panthers | $2,032,798,000 | ACC |
| Rutgers University | New Brunswick, New Jersey (55,181) | 1766 | Public | 38,912 | 1995 | Scarlet Knights | $603,083,000 | Big Ten |
| University of South Florida | Tampa, Florida (335,709) | 1956 | Public | 47,122 | 2005 | Bulls | $339,000,000 | The American |
| Syracuse University | Syracuse, New York (145,170) | 1870 | Private/Non-sectarian | 20,407 | 1979 | Orange | $849,157,000 | ACC |

=== Full members except in football ===
| Institution | Location (Population) | Founded | Type | Enrollment | Year Joined | Nickname | Endowment | Current Conference |
|---|---|---|---|---|---|---|---|---|
| DePaul University | Chicago, Illinois (2,695,598) | 1898 | Private/Catholic | 25,398 | 2005 | Blue Demons | $414,000,000 | Big East |
| Georgetown University | Washington, D.C. (601,723) | 1789 | Private/Catholic | 16,437 | 1979 | Hoyas | $1,009,736,000 | Big East |
| Marquette University | Milwaukee, Wisconsin (594,833) | 1881 | Private/Catholic | 11,599 | 2005 | Golden Eagles | $401,200,000 | Big East |
| University of Notre Dame | Notre Dame, Indiana (101,168) | 1842 | Private/Catholic | 11,733 | 1995 | Fighting Irish | $6,800,000,000 | ACC (FBS Independent in Football) |
| Providence College | Providence, Rhode Island (178,042) | 1917 | Private/Catholic | 4,585 | 1979 | Friars | $165,900,000 | Big East |
| St. John's University | Jamaica, Queens, New York City (216,866/8,175,133) | 1870 | Private/Catholic | 21,354 | 1979 | Red Storm | $303,057,000 | Big East |
| Seton Hall University | South Orange, New Jersey (16,198) | 1856 | Private/Catholic | 9,745 | 1979 | Pirates | $162,889,000 | Big East |
| Villanova University | Villanova, Pennsylvania (9,189) | 1842 | Private/Catholic | 10,482 | 1980 | Wildcats | $370,292,000 | Big East |

=== Associate members ===
| Institution | Location (Population) | Primary Conference | Type | Enrollment | Year Joined | Nickname | Big East Sport | Endowment | Current Conference |
|---|---|---|---|---|---|---|---|---|---|
| Loyola University Maryland | Baltimore, Maryland (620,961) | MAAC | Private/Catholic | 6,531 | 2005 | Greyhounds | Women's lacrosse | $143,000,000 | Patriot League |
| Temple University | Philadelphia (1,526,006) | A-10 | Public (state-related) | 37,697 | 2012 | Owls | Football | $280,000,000 | The American |

=== Previous members ===
==== Former full members ====
| Institution | Location (Population) | Beginning Year | Ending Year | Nickname | Current Conference |
|---|---|---|---|---|---|
| Boston College | Chestnut Hill, Massachusetts (22,491) | 1979 | 2005 | Eagles | ACC |
| University of Miami | Coral Gables, Florida (42,871) | 1991 | 2004 | Hurricanes | ACC |
| Virginia Tech ^{*} | Blacksburg, Virginia (42,620) | 2000 | 2004 | Hokies | ACC |
| West Virginia University ^{**} | Morgantown, West Virginia (29,660) | 1995 | 2012 | Mountaineers | Big 12 |

^{*} Virginia Tech was an associate member of the Big East 1991–2000. ^{**} West Virginia was an associate member of the Big East 1991–1995. Note: Syracuse, Pittsburgh, Notre Dame and Louisville left the Big East and joined the ACC. Syracuse and Pittsburgh departed the Big East on July 1, 2013; each paid the Big East $7.5 million to depart on that date. Notre Dame joined the ACC on July 1, 2013, while Louisville left for the ACC on July 1, 2014. Rutgers left for the Big Ten on July 1, 2014.

==== Former associate members ====
| Institution | Location (Population) | Membership Type | Primary Conference | Joined | Left | Nickname |
|---|---|---|---|---|---|---|
| Rutgers University ^{*} | New Brunswick, New Jersey (55,181) | Football | A-10 (1976–1995) | 1991 | 1995 | Scarlet Knights |
| West Virginia University ^{*} | Morgantown, West Virginia (29,660) | Football | A-10 (1976–1995) | 1991 | 1995 | Mountaineers |
| Virginia Tech ^{**} | Blacksburg, Virginia (42,620) | Football | Metro (1991–1995); A-10 (1995–2000) | 1991 | 2000 | Hokies |
| Temple University ^{***} | Philadelphia, Pennsylvania (1,526,006) | Football | A-10 (1982–2013) | 1991 | 2004 | Owls |

^{*} Rutgers and West Virginia joined the Big East as full members in 1995. ^{**} Virginia Tech joined the Big East as a full member in 2000. ^{***} Temple was removed from the Big East as a football-only member after the 2004 football season. Temple was invited to the Big East as a full member in March 2012, with football returning in July 2012 and all other sports joining in July 2013.

==== Invited members ====
The following is a list of institutions which planned to join the Big East conference but later reneged. The Big East invited ten schools – five full time members (University of Houston, Texas Christian University, Southern Methodist University, University of Memphis, University of Central Florida) and, five as football-only members (United States Air Force Academy, United States Naval Academy, Boise State University, Brigham Young University, San Diego State University). To further stabilize the conference, members unanimously agreed to double the exit fee from $5 million to $10 million, contingent on any one accepted invitation. Of the schools, all four invited to full membership accepted, as well as football-only Boise State, Navy, and San Diego State. BYU and the Big East were unable to come to terms; the conference insisted that BYU relinquish its TV rights for its home games as a condition of membership, and BYU was unwilling to do so.

| Institution | Location (Population) | Former conference | Current Conference | Year | Nickname |
|---|---|---|---|---|---|
| University of Central Florida ^{**} | Orlando, Florida (307,573) | Conference USA (2005–2012) | Big 12 | 2012 | Knights |
| University of Houston ^{**} | Houston, Texas (2.3 million) | Conference USA (1995–2012) | Big 12 | 2012 | Cougars |
| University of Memphis^{**} | Memphis, Tennessee (650,910) | Conference USA (1995–2012) | The American | 2012 | Tigers |
| Southern Methodist University^{**} | Dallas, Texas (1.3 million) | Conference USA (2005–2012) | ACC | 2012 | Mustangs |
| Texas Christian University ^{*} | Fort Worth, Texas (758,738) | Mountain West (2005–2012) | Big 12 | 2011 | Horned Frogs |

^{*} TCU was to join the Big East as a full member in 2012 before accepting an invitation to the Big 12. ^{**} Houston, Memphis, SMU, and UCF accepted invitations to the Big East as full members.

== Sports ==
The Big East Conference sponsored championship competition in eleven men's and thirteen women's NCAA sanctioned sports. Temple was an Associate member for football, and Loyola, Maryland was an Associate member for women's lacrosse.

Teams in Big East Conference competition
| Sport | Men's | Women's |
|---|---|---|
| Baseball | 11 | - |
| Basketball | 15 | 15 |
| Cross country | 14 | 15 |
| Field hockey | - | 7 |
| Football | 8 | - |
| Golf | 12 | 8 |
| Lacrosse | 7 | 9 |
| Rowing | - | 8 |
| Soccer | 15 | 15 |
| Softball | - | 13 |
| Swimming & Diving | 9 | 10 |
| Tennis | 9 | 15 |
| Track and field (indoor) | 13 | 14 |
| Track and field (outdoor) | 13 | 14 |
| Volleyball | - | 14 |

NOTE: Under NCAA rules reflecting the large number of male scholarship participants in football and attempting to address gender equity concerns (see also Title IX), each football playing member institution is required to provide two more women's varsity sports than men's.

== Men's basketball ==

The Big East was founded by seven charter schools in 1979 (Providence, St. John's, Georgetown, Syracuse, Seton Hall, Connecticut, and Boston College). Villanova joined the following year, followed by Pittsburgh in 1982.

Georgetown, led by senior Sleepy Floyd and freshman Patrick Ewing, made the NCAA Championship Game in 1982. Just two years later, in 1984, Georgetown won the Big East's first NCAA basketball championship with a victory over the University of Houston.

The following year three Big East teams (Villanova, St. John's, and Georgetown) all advanced to the Final Four, culminating in Villanova's stunning championship game victory over the heavily favored Georgetown Hoyas. The conference's 1985 success was nearly duplicated in 1987, when Syracuse and a surprising Providence both made the Final Four, followed by the Orangemen's narrow loss to Indiana University in the tournament final. Two years later, the Seton Hall Pirates also advanced to the NCAA Championship Game, but were defeated by the Michigan Wolverines in an overtime heartbreaker.

| Team | NCAA championships | Final Fours | NCAA appearances |
|---|---|---|---|
| Cincinnati | 2 | 6 | 25 |
| Connecticut | 5 | 6 | 36 |
| DePaul | 0 | 2 | 17* |
| Georgetown | 1 | 5 | 24 |
| Louisville | 3* | 10* | 39* |
| Marquette | 1 | 3 | 27 |
| Notre Dame | 0 | 1 | 29 |
| Pittsburgh | 0 | 1 | 21 |
| Providence | 0 | 2 | 15 |
| Rutgers | 0 | 1 | 6 |
| St. John's | 0 | 2 | 26 |
| Seton Hall | 0 | 1 | 9 |
| South Florida | 0 | 0 | 3 |
| Syracuse | 1 | 5 | 34 |
| Villanova | 3 | 5* | 34* |
| West Virginia | 0 | 2 | 26 |
*Does not include Villanova's 1971 NCAA appearance and Final Four nor DePaul's 1986–89 NCAA appearances nor Louisville's 2012–2013 NCAA appearances, 2012–2013 Final Four, and 2013 National Championship that were vacated by the NCAA.

Throughout the 1980s and early 1990s, Georgetown, Villanova, St. John's, and Syracuse were the primary powers in the conference. UConn became a power in 1990 with a # 1 seed and a trip to the Elite 8 before being defeated by Duke. Georgetown was led by John Thompson Jr., who was named three times as the conference Coach of the Year. They won five regular season conference championships and six Big East tournaments to go with their 1984 national title. Villanova was coached by Rollie Massimino, who led them to the 1985 NCAA Championship in a historic 66–64 win over No. 1 ranked Georgetown where forward Ed Pinckney was named the Most Outstanding Player. In their first 11 seasons in the Big East, Villanova made 9 trips to the NCAA tournament including advancing to the NCAA Elite Eight in 1982, 1983 and 1988 as well as their 1985 Championship season. Massimino coached for 19 seasons at Villanova, compiling a record of 357–241 (.596). In the NCAA tournament, Massimino had an incredible 20–10 record (.667). St. John's was led by Lou Carnesecca, who won the National Coach of the Year honor in 1983 and 1985. He led the Redmen (now the Red Storm) to the 1985 Final Four, and made a post-season appearance in each of his 24 years at the helm. Syracuse has been led by alumnus Jim Boeheim since the 1977 season. He was named conference Coach of the Year in 1984 and 1991. During this period, the Orangemen won five regular season conference championships, three Big East tournaments, and were invited to the NCAA tournament every year but two (1981 and 1982), losing the 1987 National Final to Indiana. Syracuse eventually won its first national title in 2003, led by coach Boeheim and freshman Carmelo Anthony.

Beginning with their first Big East championship in 1990, Connecticut has become the preeminent power in the Big East. Over the past two decades, UConn has made many deep runs in NCAA tournament, playing in the Elite 8 nine times and making four appearances in the Final Four. Hall of Fame coach Jim Calhoun's program, led by such stars as Ray Allen, Richard "Rip" Hamilton, Caron Butler, Emeka Okafor and Kemba Walker, averaged nearly 26 wins per year during that time span, won numerous Big East regular season and tournament championships, and claimed the National Championship in 1999, 2004 and 2011.

The conference got a then-record eight teams into the NCAA Men's tournament in 2006 and again matched their own record in both 2008 and 2010. At the start of the 2008–2009 season, many sports analysts predicted that the conference would surpass the record by sending 10 teams to the 2009 NCAA Division I men's basketball tournament. When the brackets were revealed, seven made it, but three of them (Louisville, Pittsburgh and Connecticut) gained No. 1 seeds, and Louisville earned the top seed overall. Connecticut and Villanova (a No. 3 seed) both reached the Final Four. At the finish of the 2010–11 season, the Big East eclipsed its record, sending 11 teams to the 2011 NCAA Division I men's basketball tournament.

The conference has a number of former players currently playing in the National Basketball Association with some of the most recent being Ray Allen, Caron Butler, Carmelo Anthony, Ryan Gomes, Austin Croshere, Richard "Rip" Hamilton, Ben Gordon, Emeka Okafor, Troy Murphy, Hakim Warrick, Quincy Douby, Dante Cunningham, Randy Foye, Kyle Lowry, Rudy Gay, Matt Carroll, Jake Voskuhl, Etan Thomas, Samuel Dalembert, Charlie Villanueva, Donté Greene, Ron Artest, Chris Quinn, Jason Hart, Tim Thomas, Aaron Gray, Daniel Ochefu, Sam Young, DeJuan Blair, Wilson Chandler, Jeff Green, Joe Alexander, Marcus Williams, Jonny Flynn, Terrence Williams, Earl Clark, Roy Hibbert, Wesley Johnson, Wesley Matthews, Lazar Hayward, Jimmy Butler, Steve Novak, Jae Crowder, Maalik Wayns, and Darius Johnson-Odom.

== Women's basketball ==

Big East women's basketball was just as competitive as the conference's men's programs. Connecticut coach Geno Auriemma has led his women's team to eight national championships (including four between 2000 and 2004) and four undefeated seasons (1995, 2002, 2009, and 2010). Connecticut set the record for longest winning streak in all of NCAA women's basketball history with a 70-game winning streak stretching from 2001 to 2003. This streak was ended in 2003 when Villanova beat Connecticut for the Big East tournament title, in what is considered one of the biggest upsets in women's basketball (Villanova would go on to reach the Elite Eight that year). The Huskies broke their own record with consecutive unbeaten championship seasons in 2009 and 2010, and stretched their streak to 90, a Division I record for both sexes, before losing to Stanford during the 2010–11 season.

Due to the strength of the Connecticut program, 2001 national champion and 2011 and 2012 national runner-up Notre Dame, and 2007 national runner-up Rutgers, the Big East has emerged as one of the major powers in women's college basketball. In 2009 two Big East schools met in the national championship game (Connecticut and Louisville) and the South Florida women's basketball team defeated Kansas to become the WNIT champions. In 2011, UConn and Notre Dame both made the Final Four; the Irish defeated the Huskies in their semifinal but lost to Texas A&M in the NCAA Championship Game. The Irish returned to the championship game in 2012, losing there to unbeaten Baylor.

The final season under the original conference structure, 2012–13, saw three Big East teams make the Final Four—UConn, Notre Dame, and Louisville. UConn first defeated Notre Dame in the semifinals and, in a rematch of the 2009 final, defeated Louisville for the national title.

== Football ==

Big East began football during the 1991–1992 season with the addition of Miami and was a founding member of the Bowl Championship Series.

In the league's early years the University of Miami dominated, winning nine of the first thirteen championships and two national championships in 1991 and 2001. Virginia Tech also did well, winning the conference in 1995, 1996, and in 1999, when they also earned a No. 2 national ranking. West Virginia and Syracuse were the only other teams to win conference titles during the league's original alignment.

The conference experienced a major reconstruction when Miami and Virginia Tech left for the Atlantic Coast Conference in 2004, followed by Boston College in 2005. Initially, Syracuse University was in place to make the jump instead of Virginia Tech, but in 2003, the governor of Virginia Mark Warner put pressure on the ACC (via the vote of the University of Virginia) to ensure that Virginia Tech was not left out of the conference expansion. Syracuse, then, was not invited to the ACC and was left to remain in the Big East. Temple had joined the Big East for football only in 1991, but found it difficult to compete with the other league teams and drew very poor attendance to its games. The conference was compelled to expel the Owls voluntarily in 2004 (after playing two seasons as an independent, Temple joined the MAC in 2007).

The universities that replaced them were Louisville, South Florida and Cincinnati from Conference USA. The league also invited the University of Connecticut to play football a year earlier than planned. At about this time, the BCS announced that it would adjust the automatic bids granted to its six founding conferences based on results from 2004 to 2007, and that there would be five, six, or seven such bids starting in 2008. The obvious inference was that soon the Big East might lose its bid.

The conference's fortunes improved in 2005. The three new teams from Conference USA began play that year, restoring the league to eight teams. West Virginia won the conference title and the Sugar Bowl, and finished 11–1 and finished No. 5 in the AP poll. Newcomer Louisville also ranked in the Top 20.

In 2006, West Virginia, Louisville, and Rutgers all entered November undefeated. However, they did not stay that way, as in a trio of exciting games over the next month, Louisville defeated West Virginia 44–34, Rutgers defeated Louisville 28–25, and West Virginia defeated Rutgers 41–39 in three overtimes. Louisville won the conference title in the end. In bowl action, the Big East went 5–0, including an Orange Bowl victory for Louisville over Wake Forest and a win by West Virginia over Georgia Tech in the Gator Bowl. Louisville would finish the season ranked 6th, West Virginia 10th, and Rutgers 12th in the final AP Poll.

In 2007, USF rose to No. 2 in the BCS rankings. They lost their next three games, however, to drop out of the rankings. They eventually finished the season No. 21 in the final BCS polls. The Connecticut Huskies, getting as high as No. 13, and West Virginia remained in the top 25. Cincinnati also rose as high as No. 15 in the rankings eventually finishing the season with 10 wins and a No. 17 ranking. Connecticut lost subsequent games and dropped substantially in the rankings, ultimately finishing 25th. On the final day of the season, Pittsburgh upset No. 2 WVU 13–9 in the 100th edition of the Backyard Brawl to give the Huskies a share of the conference championship, while WVU was stopped on the doorstep of the BCS National Championship Game. In bowl games, WVU upset the Big 12 Champion Oklahoma in the Fiesta Bowl, despite having lost their highly touted coach, Rich Rodriguez to Michigan less than a month before the game. West Virginia finished the season ranked No. 6 and Cincinnati finished ranked #17.

The 2009 season saw Cincinnati finish the regular season undefeated at 12–0 and climb to No. 3 in the final BCS standings. After completing a fourth quarter comeback to beat Pittsburgh on the final day of the season, the Bearcats narrowly missed a spot in the BCS national championship game, as No. 2 Texas pulled out a last second win in the Big 12 Championship Game. The Bearcats would go on to lose the Sugar Bowl to No. 5 Florida and finish the year 12–1.

On September 18, 2011, both Pittsburgh and Syracuse were accepted as Atlantic Coast Conference members although the exact date of the move was still uncertain. There were also rumors that UConn was also looking to leave the Big East and join Pittsburgh and Syracuse in the ACC. On October 28, 2011, West Virginia announced it was leaving the Big East to join the Big 12 in 2012. TCU, who had accepted an invitation to join the Big East in the 2012 season, withdrew its acceptance and instead accepted an invitation to join the Big 12.

In 2011, as a response to major shifts in the college football conference landscape, the conference added five new members to help offset the losses of Pittsburgh, Syracuse, and West Virginia. On December 7, 2011, the conference officially added the University of Houston, Southern Methodist University, and the University of Central Florida as all-sports members. Additionally, Boise State and San Diego State of the Mountain West Conference were added as football-only members, but Boise State eventually decided not to join the Big East, which allowed San Diego State to withdraw without penalty.

=== Champions ===
| Season | Conference Champion | Conference record | Bowl Coalition/Alliance/BCS Bowl Representative |
|---|---|---|---|
| 1993 | West Virginia | 7–0 | West Virginia |
| 1994 | Miami | 7–0 | Miami |
| 1995 | Virginia Tech / Miami | 6–1 | Virginia Tech |
| 1996 | Virginia Tech / Miami / Syracuse | 6–1 | Virginia Tech |
| 1997 | Syracuse | 6–1 | Syracuse |
| 1998 | Syracuse | 6–1 | Syracuse |
| 1999 | Virginia Tech | 7–0 | Virginia Tech |
| 2000 | Miami | 7–0 | Miami |
| 2001 | Miami | 7–0 | Miami |
| 2002 | Miami | 7–0 | Miami |
| 2003 | Miami / West Virginia | 6–1 | Miami |
| 2004 | Pittsburgh / Boston College / Syracuse / West Virginia | 4–2 | Pittsburgh |
| 2005 | West Virginia | 7–0 | West Virginia |
| 2006 | Louisville | 6–1 | Louisville |
| 2007 | West Virginia / Connecticut | 5–2 | West Virginia |
| 2008 | Cincinnati | 6–1 | Cincinnati |
| 2009 | Cincinnati | 7–0 | Cincinnati |
| 2010 | Connecticut / Pittsburgh / West Virginia | 5–2 | Connecticut |
| 2011 | West Virginia / Cincinnati / Louisville | 5–2 | West Virginia |
| 2012 | Louisville / Cincinnati / Rutgers / Syracuse | 5–2 | Louisville** |

*No official championship awarded in 1991 and 1992, as the conference did not start full league play until 1993.

**Louisville received the BCS bid since they were the highest ranked team in the final BCS poll.

=== BCS Bowl Games ===
The Big East had an 8–7 record in BCS bowl games, including a 1–2 record in National Championship games.

Big East in BCS Bowl Games
| Date | BCS Bowl Game | Rank | Winning team | Points | Rank | Losing team | Points |
|---|---|---|---|---|---|---|---|
| January 2, 1999 | FedEx Orange Bowl | No. 8 | Florida | 31 | No. 15 | **Syracuse** | 10 |
| January 4, 2000 | Nokia Sugar Bowl (National Championship) | No. 1 | Florida State | 46 | No. 2 | **Virginia Tech** | 29 |
| January 2, 2001 | Nokia Sugar Bowl | No. 3 | **Miami (FL)** | 37 | No. 7 | Florida | 20 |
| January 3, 2002 | Rose Bowl (National Championship) | No. 1 | **Miami (FL)** | 37 | No. 2 | Nebraska | 14 |
| January 3, 2003 | Tostitos Fiesta Bowl (National Championship) | No. 2 | Ohio State | 31 | No. 1 | **Miami (FL)** | 24 (2 OT) |
| January 1, 2004 | FedEx Orange Bowl | No. 9 | **Miami (FL)** | 16 | No. 7 | Florida State | 14 |
| January 1, 2005 | Tostitos Fiesta Bowl | No. 6 | Utah | 35 | No. 21 | **Pittsburgh** | 7 |
| January 2, 2006 | Nokia Sugar Bowl | No. 11 | **West Virginia** | 38 | No. 7 | Georgia | 35 |
| January 2, 2007 | FedEx Orange Bowl | No. 6 | **Louisville** | 24 | No. 14 | Wake Forest | 13 |
| January 2, 2008 | Tostitos Fiesta Bowl | No. 9 | **West Virginia** | 48 | No. 4 | Oklahoma | 28 |
| January 1, 2009 | FedEx Orange Bowl | No. 19 | Virginia Tech | 20 | No. 12 | **Cincinnati** | 7 |
| January 1, 2010 | Allstate Sugar Bowl | No. 5 | Florida | 51 | No. 3 | **Cincinnati** | 24 |
| January 1, 2011 | Tostitos Fiesta Bowl | No. 7 | Oklahoma | 48 | NR | **Connecticut** | 20 |
| January 4, 2012 | Discover Orange Bowl | No. 23 | **West Virginia** | 70 | No. 15 | Clemson | 33 |
| January 2, 2013 | Allstate Sugar Bowl | No. 21 | **Louisville** | 33 | No. 3 | Florida | 23 |

- Big East team in **bold**

=== Bowl games ===
| Pick | Name | Location | Opposing Conference | Opposing Pick |
|---|---|---|---|---|
| 1 | Bowl Championship Series† | – | BCS At-Large | – |
| 2 | Russell Athletic Bowl | Orlando, Florida | ACC | 3 |
| 3 | Belk Bowl | Charlotte, North Carolina | ACC | 5 |
| 4 | Pinstripe Bowl | Bronx, New York | Big 12 | 7 |
| 5/6 | BBVA Compass Bowl | Birmingham, Alabama | SEC | 8/9 |
| 5/6 | Liberty Bowl | Memphis, Tennessee | C-USA or SEC | 1 or 8/9 |
| 7 | Beef 'O' Brady's Bowl | St. Petersburg, Florida | C-USA | 4 |

Notes on bowl game selection

- † The Big East's BCS representative was not tied directly to a specific BCS Bowl. It was selected to a bowl in the same manner as an at-large team. The BCS may select a second team to play in another BCS bowl game. Beginning in 2008, the Big East champion was rotated between the Orange Bowl, Sugar Bowl, and Fiesta Bowl (in that order).
- Notre Dame was eligible to be chosen in lieu of a Big East team for the Russell Athletic Bowl one time during a four-year period. In a separate rule specific only to Notre Dame that does not affect the Big East's BCS representative, Notre Dame was eligible to receive a BCS automatic berth if they finish within the top 8 of the BCS Rankings.

== Lacrosse ==
=== Men's ===
In 2010, the Big East created a men's lacrosse league with Georgetown, Notre Dame, Providence, Rutgers, St. John's, Syracuse, and Villanova participating. Men's lacrosse was the 24th sport sponsored by the Big East Conference and was the 11th men's sport. The teams play a six-game single round-robin regular-season schedule. There was no Big East men's lacrosse championship tournament in 2010 and 2011. Instead, the Big East champion was determined by conference-game winning percentage at the conclusion of the regular season. This winner received the league's automatic bid to the 16-team NCAA Division I Men's Lacrosse Championship. The first Big East championship tournament was played beginning in the 2012 season. Syracuse dominated the sport until its switch to the Atlantic Coast Conference.

Of the Big East men's lacrosse schools in the 2013 season, the final season under the original conference structure:

- Georgetown, Providence, St. John's, and Villanova became members of the reconfigured Big East. Marquette, which announced plans to add the sport for the 2014 season, was also in the new conference.
- Notre Dame and Syracuse joined the ACC, which already sponsored the sport.
- Rutgers spent the 2014 season in The American before joining the Big Ten. Since Rutgers was the only current or future full member of The American that sponsored men's lacrosse, it would remain in Big East lacrosse until the Big Ten began lacrosse competition in the 2015 season.

| Team | NCAA Championships | Final Fours | NCAA appearances |
|---|---|---|---|
| Georgetown | 0 | 1 | 11 |
| Marquette* | 0 | 0 | 0 |
| Notre Dame | 0 | 2 | 14 |
| Providence | 0 | 0 | 3 |
| Rutgers | 0 | 0 | 9 |
| St. John's | 0 | 0 | 0 |
| Syracuse | 10** | 28 | 30 |
| Villanova | 0 | 0 | 2 |
^{*Marquette began Big East competition in 2013–14.}^{**Does not include Syracuse's 1990 NCAA National Championship that was vacated by the NCAA for rules infractions.}

=== Women's ===
The Big East has sponsored women's lacrosse since the 2000–01 season. Georgetown and former member Syracuse have dominated, winning ten championships (including one shared one) as of the 2012–13 season.

== Cross country ==
The Big East Conference first crowned men's cross country champions in 1979 and women's cross country champions in 1982. During the history of the original Big East, six different women's teams won Big East Championships: Boston College, Georgetown, Notre Dame, Providence, Villanova and West Virginia. On the men's side six teams won Big East Championships as well: Georgetown, Louisville, Notre Dame, Providence, Syracuse and Villanova.

In both the 2009 and 2010 season, the Villanova women captured the NCAA Cross Country Team Championship as they have largely dominated the Big East over the years with numerous Conference Titles. Led by Sheila Reid, a junior from New Market, Ont. who won the 2010 individual champion, the top-ranked Wildcats captured their second straight NCAA Division I women's cross country championship. Reid sprinted past Georgetown's Emily Infeld and Oregon's Jordan Hasay in the final 200 meters to win the individual title. It was the Villanova Women's ninth NCAA Team Championship overall in Cross Country. The Wildcats captured six consecutive NCAA Championships from 1989 to 1994 and also won the title again in 1998, 2009 and 2010.

== Conference champions by year ==
| Year | Men's basketball regular season champion | Men's basketball tournament champion | Women's basketball regular season champion | Women's basketball tournament champion | Football champion |
|---|---|---|---|---|---|
| 1979–80 | Georgetown/St. John's/Syracuse | Georgetown | | | |
| 1980–81 | Boston College | Syracuse | | | |
| 1981–82 | Villanova | Georgetown | | | |
| 1982–83 | Boston College/St. John's/Villanova | St. John's | Providence/St. John's | St. John's | |
| 1983–84 | Georgetown | Georgetown | Pittsburgh/Villanova | Pittsburgh | |
| 1984–85 | St. John's | Georgetown | St. John's/Villanova | St. John's | |
| 1985–86 | St. John's/Syracuse | St. John's | Providence | Providence | |
| 1986–87 | Georgetown/Pittsburgh/Syracuse | Georgetown | Villanova | Villanova | |
| 1987–88 | Pittsburgh | Syracuse | Syracuse | Syracuse | |
| 1988–89 | Georgetown | Georgetown | Connecticut | Connecticut | |
| 1989–90 | Connecticut/Syracuse | Connecticut | Connecticut/Providence | Providence | |
| 1990–91 | Syracuse | Seton Hall | Connecticut | Connecticut | |
| 1991–92 | Georgetown/St. John's/Seton Hall | Syracuse | Miami | Miami | Miami |
| 1992–93 | Seton Hall | Seton Hall | Georgetown/Miami | Miami | Miami |
| 1993–94 | Connecticut | Providence | Connecticut | Connecticut | West Virginia |
| 1994–95 | Connecticut | Villanova | Connecticut | Connecticut | Miami |
| 1995–96 | Connecticut | Connecticut | Connecticut | Connecticut | Virginia Tech/Miami |
| 1996–97 | Boston College/Villanova | Boston College | Connecticut | Connecticut | Virginia Tech/Miami/Syracuse |
| 1997–98 | Connecticut | Connecticut | Connecticut | Connecticut | Syracuse |
| 1998–99 | Connecticut | Connecticut | Connecticut/Rutgers | Connecticut | Syracuse† |
| 1999–2000 | Syracuse/Miami | St. John's | Connecticut | Connecticut | Virginia Tech† |
| 2000–01 | Boston College (east); Notre Dame (west) | Boston College | Connecticut/Notre Dame | Connecticut | Miami† |
| 2001–02 | Connecticut (east); Pittsburgh (west) | Connecticut | Connecticut | Connecticut | Miami† |
| 2002–03 | Boston College & Connecticut (east); Pittsburgh & Syracuse (west) | Pittsburgh | Connecticut | Villanova | Miami† |
| 2003–04 | Pittsburgh | Connecticut | Connecticut | Boston College | Miami†/West Virginia |
| 2004–05 | Boston College/Connecticut | Syracuse | Rutgers | Connecticut | Pittsburgh†/Boston College/Syracuse/West Virginia |
| 2005–06 | Connecticut/Villanova | Syracuse | Rutgers | Connecticut | West Virginia† |
| 2006–07 | Georgetown | Georgetown | Connecticut | Rutgers | Louisville† |
| 2007–08 | Georgetown | Pittsburgh | Connecticut | Connecticut | West Virginia†/Connecticut |
| 2008–09 | Louisville | Louisville | Connecticut | Connecticut | Cincinnati† |
| 2009–10 | Syracuse | West Virginia | Connecticut | Connecticut | Cincinnati† |
| 2010–11 | Pittsburgh | Connecticut | Connecticut | Connecticut | Connecticut†/West Virginia/Pittsburgh |
| 2011–12 | Syracuse | Louisville | Notre Dame | Connecticut | West Virginia†/Cincinnati/Louisville |
| 2012–13 | Georgetown/Louisville/Marquette | Louisville | Notre Dame | Notre Dame | Louisville†/Cincinnati/Rutgers/Syracuse |

†Received the Conference's BCS (or Alliance Bowl) berth

== Facilities ==
Facilities listed here are those used by each school in its final year of Big East membership before the 2013 conference split. Names and capacities are also those from each school's final year of pre-split membership, and do not necessarily reflect current data.

| School | Football stadium | Capacity | Basketball arena | Capacity | Baseball park | Capacity |
|---|---|---|---|---|---|---|
| Cincinnati | Nippert Stadium; Paul Brown Stadium^{1} | 35,097; 65,790 | Fifth Third Arena | 13,176 | Marge Schott Stadium | 3,085 |
| Connecticut | Rentschler Field | 40,000 | Harry A. Gampel Pavilion; XL Center | 10,167; 16,294 | J. O. Christian Field | 2,000 |
| DePaul | Non-football school | | Allstate Arena (men); McGrath–Phillips Arena (women) | 17,500; 3,000 | Non-baseball school | |
| Georgetown | Sponsors football in the Patriot League | | Verizon Center (men); McDonough Gymnasium (women) | 20,035; 2,500 | Shirley Povich Field | 1,500 |
| Louisville | Papa John's Cardinal Stadium | 57,000 | KFC Yum! Center | 22,090 | Jim Patterson Stadium | 2,500 |
| Marquette | Non-football school | | BMO Harris Bradley Center (men); Al McGuire Center (women) | 18,717; 4,000 | Non-baseball school | |
| Notre Dame | Sponsors football as a Division I-FBS independent | | Edmund P. Joyce Center | 9,149 | Frank Eck Stadium | 2,500 |
| Pittsburgh | Heinz Field | 65,050 | Petersen Events Center | 12,508 | Petersen Sports Complex | 900 |
| Providence | Non-football school | | Dunkin' Donuts Center (men); Alumni Hall (women) | 12,400; 1,854 | Non-baseball school | |
| Rutgers | High Point Solutions Stadium ^{2} | 52,454 | Louis Brown Athletic Center (The RAC) | 8,000 | Bainton Field | 1,500 |
| Seton Hall | Non-football school | | Prudential Center (men); Walsh Gymnasium (women) | 10,862; 2,600 | Owen T. Carroll Field | 600 |
| South Florida | Raymond James Stadium | 65,908 | USF Sun Dome | 10,411 | USF Baseball Stadium | 3,211 |
| St. John's | Non-football school | | Madison Square Garden (some men's games); Carnesecca Arena ^{3} | 19,979; 5,602 | Jack Kaiser Stadium | 3,500 |
| Syracuse | Carrier Dome | 49,250 | Carrier Dome ^{4} | 33,000 | Non-baseball school | |
| Temple | Lincoln Financial Field | 68,532 | Football-only member | | | |
| Villanova | Sponsors football in the Colonial Athletic Association | | Wells Fargo Center; The Pavilion ^{5} | 20,328; 6,500 | Villanova Ballpark at Plymouth | 1,500 |

Schools that moved to the Big East Conference (2013–present) are highlighted in grey. Those that moved to the Atlantic Coast Conference are in pink. Those that remained in the renamed American Athletic Conference for 2013–14 are in white.

Notes:
^{1} For certain high-profile home games, Cincinnati uses the Cincinnati Bengals' Paul Brown Stadium. In 2010, Cincinnati hosted the University of Oklahoma at Paul Brown Stadium. In 2011, Cincinnati used Paul Brown Stadium as an alternate home field for games against Louisville and West Virginia.
^{2} Late in 2006, Rutgers added approximately 3,000 temporary end zone seats that remained for the 2007 season (total 45,000). In 2008, Rutgers began a stadium expansion project that was expected to increase capacity to over 55,000 seats and add luxury and club seats. The premium seating was projected to be ready for the 2008 season and the additional 12,000 end zone seats were expected for the 2009 season. The stadium was also expected to receive a new name as part of the financing package depends on a name sponsorship.
^{3} St. John's men generally play their Big East home schedule in Madison Square Garden and their non-conference home schedule on campus at Carnesecca Arena. In 2005–06, St. John's played only one non-conference game at MSG and one Big East game on campus.
^{4} For Syracuse basketball games in the Carrier Dome, the court is laid out on one end of the field and stands are erected beside it. This makes the Carrier Dome the largest on-campus venue for college basketball in the nation.
^{5} For certain high-profile home games, Villanova uses the Wells Fargo Center, and previously used the Spectrum. In 2005–06, Villanova played three home games at the Wells Fargo Center and the rest on campus at The Pavilion. In 2006, the Wells Fargo Center was also a first-round site for the NCAA tournament. Under NCAA rules, a venue is not considered a home court unless a school plays four or more regular-season games there; this enabled Villanova to play its first two tournament games at the Wells Fargo Center (but Villanova was not considered the host school for that sub-region – the Atlantic 10 Conference was). This situation occurred again in 2009, with Villanova playing (and winning) its first two tournament games at Wells Fargo Center.

== See also ==
- Big East men's basketball tournament
- Big East women's basketball tournament
- Big East Conference baseball tournament
