= John Marinatto =

American collegiate sports commissioner (1957–2021)

John Marinatto (November 7, 1957 – June 12, 2021) was an American collegiate sports commissioner. He served as senior associate commissioner of the Big East Conference from 2002 until he began his tenure as third commissioner of the conference on July 1, 2009. He resigned from his position as commissioner on May 7, 2012.

== Biography ==
Marinatto was a native of Providence, Rhode Island, and graduated from Providence College in 1979 with a bachelor's degree in business management. He later worked at Providence as an Associate Director of Alumni/Development and as Director of Sports Information. Marinatto was later the athletic director at Providence for 14 years. He directed all aspects of the Providence Friars athletic program, including a $10 million annual budget and a staff of over 100 employees. While at Providence, Marinatto served as the Chairman of the Big East Athletic Directors' Executive Committee from 1996 to 2000, the longest tenure of any athletic director in the history of the conference. He also served the conference as the Chairman of the Athletic Directors' Finance Committee from 1992 to 1993. In addition, Marinatto served as Chairman of the Student-Athlete Advisory Committee, Women's Basketball Committee and Television Committee, and was a member of the Men's Basketball Committee, Academic Affairs Committee and Championships and Competition Committee.

As senior associate commissioner, Marinatto served as the Big East's Chief Operating Officer and was responsible for the daily administration of the conference office. He oversaw all administrative operations, including NCAA governance, finance, compliance, communications, television and championships. Marinatto was the daily contact with the league's athletic directors regarding governance and operational matters. He was a member of the NCAA Management Council and NCAA Business and Finance Cabinet and served as the Conference's representative to the NCAA Leadership Council. He served as the Chief Financial and Business Officer of the Bowl Championship Series from 2002 to 2004.

== Death ==
He died on June 12, 2021, at the age of 63. He had been living in his native Providence at the time of his death.
