= Tim Pernetti =

American college athletics administrator

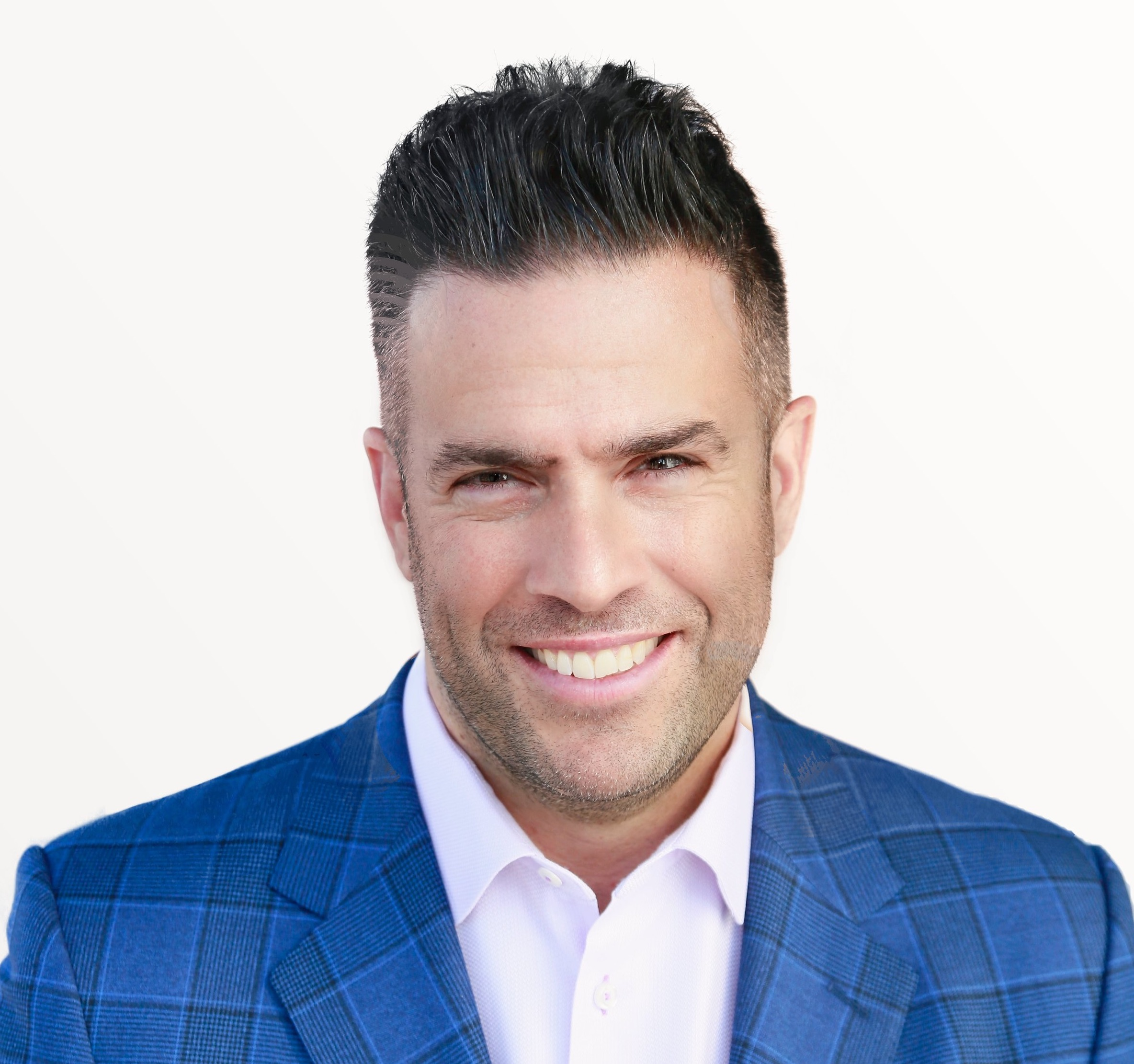
- Pernetti in 2020

Biographical details
- Born: November 2, 1970 (age 56); Teaneck, New Jersey, U.S.

Playing career
- 1989–1993: Rutgers
- Position: Tight end

Administrative career (AD unless noted)
- 2009–2013: Rutgers

Tim Pernetti is the commissioner of the American Conference (American), (Note: The conference was known as "American Athletic Conference" before July 21, 2025.) having been named to that position as the successor to Mike Aresco on December 7, 2023 and taken office on June 1, 2024. He had previously been president of IMG Academy, having been named to this post by WME/IMG in February 2015. Pernetti served previously as the chief business officer of the Major League Soccer (MLS) expansion club New York City FC. His appointment was announced by the club on September 9, 2013. Pernetti oversaw all business operations for the club, leading up to its first games in March 2015. After only eighteen months with the club, and before the first game was played, Pernetti resigned to take a job as president of multimedia for IMG's college sports business.

Pernetti is the former director of intercollegiate athletics at Rutgers University between 2009 and 2013. His appointment began as part of a five-year agreement with the university, but he was forced by then-Rutgers president Robert L. Barchi to resign early when Barchi learned Pernetti had kept men's basketball coach Mike Rice Jr. on after being shown evidence of his long-term physical and verbal abuse of players. The media coverage of the event lead to intense public scrutiny of Rutgers and its athletic programs.

== Early life ==
Pernetti was born on November 2, 1970, at Holy Name Hospital in Teaneck, New Jersey. He grew up in Wyckoff, New Jersey, and went to Sicomac School for Kindergarten through 6th grades and Dwight D. Eisenhower Middle School for 7th and 8th grades. He then attended Ramapo High School. Pernetti played football and basketball at Ramapo and captained the basketball team in 1989. He was also an all-state football player in 1988 and named the Ramapo High School Athlete of the Year in 1989. He was inducted into the Ramapo High School Sports Hall of Fame in 2007. Pernetti then earned a scholarship to play for the Scarlet Knights as a tight end from 1989 to 1993. He earned a bachelor's degree in journalism and mass media and a master's degree in communication from Rutgers.

== Media management ==
From 1994 to 2003, Pernetti worked in various television programming positions for ABC Sports. By 1996, he oversaw the day-to-day college football business for ABC Sports, managing relationships with college football bowl games. He left ABC Sports in 2003 and joined CSTV as Vice President of Programming & Talent. Pernetti managed the agreement between the Mountain West Conference and CSTV that produced the MTN network. In 2006, CSTV was acquired by CBS Television Pernetti was promoted to oversee the content strategy, rights acquisitions, and relationships for CBS College Sports Network. He was named a recipient of the Sports Business Journal's "40 Under 40" Award recognizing the most powerful and influential people in the sports business under the age of 40 in 2008 and a recipient of the MultiChannel News 40 under 40 recognizing the most influential people in cable Television also in 2008. From 2001 to 2009, Pernetti also worked as a football analyst for Rutgers Football and Sports USA Radio network's coverage of the NFL. He also was a regular TV contributor as a college football analyst on SNY in 2006 and 2007, and performed TV game analyst duties on FSN and ESPN Regional Television from 2002 to 2005.

== Athletic director ==
On April 1, 2009, Pernetti began work as the Director of Intercollegiate Athletics at Rutgers University as part of a five-year contract. In the role he oversaw 24 men's and women's sports, fundraising and development, a staff of more than 200 employees and also oversaw coaching searches and hires in men's and women's sports. Pernetti is credited with transforming the business at Rutgers and for record-breaking fundraising results in four years. During his tenure, Rutgers Athletics generated more than $100M in incremental revenue for the department. Pernetti is also credited with building the Rutgers Athletics brand, and creating more media visibility than ever before. Pernetti is credited with negotiating the agreement to bring Rutgers to the Big Ten Conference in 2014. For his efforts, Pernetti was named one of the five candidates for Sports Business Journal National Athletic Director of the Year.

=== Men's basketball controversy ===
Pernetti came under fire in April 2013 when a video surfaced showing men's basketball coach Mike Rice abusing his players during practice. The video showed Rice throwing basketballs at players, including at their heads, kicking players, and calling players homophobic slurs. When Pernetti was made aware of Rice's behavior at team practices, he opted to suspend Rice for 3 games, fine him $50,000, and require that he complete anger management courses.

However, Pernetti chose not to fire Rice, and the reasons behind the discipline were not made public. After ESPN's Outside the Lines aired the video on April 2, 2013, many expressed their disbelief on blogs and on Twitter that Rice had not been fired and that Pernetti should now be fired for his leniency toward Rice, whom Pernetti had hired as one of his first major acts as Rutgers AD. Elected officials joined the ensuing outcry, with New Jersey Governor Chris Christie condemning Rice's behavior, and State Assembly Speaker Sheila Oliver demanding that Rice be fired. When school president Robert Barchi saw the video for the first time on the night of April 2 (though he had signed off on the decision to suspend Rice in November), he called in Pernetti and told him that Rice had to leave immediately. Rice was fired the next day.

On April 3, Barchi told Pernetti that he also had to go, and gave him the option of either resigning or being fired. After two days of negotiations, Pernetti resigned on April 5. He later said that he wanted to fire Rice in December, but did not believe at the time that Rutgers policy would support a firing. According to The Record, when Barchi saw the video for the first time, he concluded that if Pernetti did not consider Rice's actions a firing offense at the time, it would be untenable for Pernetti to stay.

== Personal life ==
Pernetti sits on the board of directors of the REED Academy, a school in Oakland, New Jersey, serving children with autistic spectrum disorder. Pernetti also sits on the Board of Directors for the Christopher and Dana Reeve Foundation, and Team LeGrand, the recently formed foundation of former Rutgers Football Player, Eric LeGrand. He and his wife Danielle have three children.
